= Anne Harrington =

American historian of science

- Born: 1960 (age 65–66)
- Occupation: professor
- Years active: 1994–present
- Known for: Mind Fixers: Psychiatry's Troubled Search for the Biology of Mental Illness
- Spouse: John Durant

Academic background
- Education: University of Oxford

Academic work
- Discipline: History of Medicine, Human Sciences, Medical Humanities, Psychiatry, Neuroscience
- Institutions: Harvard University

Anne Harrington (born 1960) is an American science historian and the Franklin L. Ford Professor of the History of Science at Harvard University. Her primary research area is the history of psychiatry, neuroscience, and cognitive science.

== Education and career ==
Harrington obtained her Bachelor of Arts from Harvard University in 1982. She then attended the University of Oxford, where she earned a doctorate in modern history, specializing in the history of science, in 1985. She returned to Harvard in 1988, after holding postdoctoral positions in London and Freiburg, joining the Department of the History of Science as an assistant professor. She was promoted to associate professor in 1991 and full professor four years later. Since 2011, she became director of undergraduate studies.

At Harvard, Harrington has taught courses on "Madness and Medicine", "Evolution and Human Nature", "Broken Brains", “Stories under the Skin”, "Freud and the American Academy", "The Minded Body" and "In Search of Mind".

== Mind Fixers: Psychiatry's Troubled Search for the Biology of Mental Illness ==
In this book Harrington shows that the pathological basis of almost all mental disorders remains as unknown today as it was in 1886. Even as psychiatrists prescribe a widening variety of treatments, none of them can say exactly why any of these biological therapies work. Regarding the "chemical imbalance" theory of mental illness, she writes “Ironically, just as the public was embracing the ‘serotonin imbalance’ theory of depression, researchers were forming a new consensus” about the idea behind that theory: It was “deeply flawed and probably outright wrong.”

A reviewer in The Atlantic wrote: "[I]t’s a tale of promising roads that turned out to be dead ends, of treatments that seemed miraculous in their day but barbaric in retrospect, of public-health policies that were born in hope but destined for disaster."

== See also ==
- Jon Franklin's pulitzer prize winning series The Mind Fixers

== Selected publications ==
- Medicine, Mind and the Double Brain (1987)
- Reenchanted Science (1997)
- The Cure Within: A History of Mind-Body Medicine (2007)
- The Dalai Lama at MIT (co-edited with Arthur Zajonc, 2008)
- Harrington, Anne (2019). Mind Fixers: Psychiatry's Troubled Search for the Biology of Mental Illness. Norton. ISBN 9780393071221.
