= Depression and immune function =

Major depression is often associated or correlated with immune function dysregulation, and the two are thought to share similar physiological pathways and risk factors. Primarily seen through increased inflammation, this relationship is bidirectional with depression often resulting in increased immune response and illness resulting in prolonged sadness and lack of activity. This association is seen both long-term and short-term, with the presence of one often being accompanied by the other and both inflammation and depression often being co-morbid with other conditions.

Explanations for this relationship have come from both medical and evolutionary approaches, with disagreements stemming primarily about whether the connection is functional and why depression and inflammation share similar physiological pathways.

== Depression and inflammation ==
Major depression is often associated with biomarkers indicative of inflammatory responses, with interleukin-6, interleukin-1, interleukin-2 receptor, tumor necrosis factor alpha, C-reactive protein, and monocyte chemotactic protein-1 all being found to be elevated in those with depression. Similarly, the same biomarkers are also strongly associated with sickness behavior, with both humans and non-human animals displaying decreased motor activity and lowered interest in normal activities in experimental and naturalistic studies. Despite these symptoms overlapping with major depression, they are insufficient to result in a diagnosis on their own, with their connection to inflammation being better understood than their connection to depression.

The relationship between inflammation and depression is also seen across the lifespan, with inflammation at one point being associated with an increased risk of depression later in life. This has been seen in relatively short periods with both adult men and women with high levels of inflammatory markers experiencing increased risk of depression in the following years. Similar affects are also seen over longer periods of time, with multiple longitudinal studies finding high levels of inflammation early in life to be associated with an increased risk of depression as an adult. Although less studied, evidence also exists for this relationship also being found in the opposite direction, with early experiences of major depression being associated with stronger inflammatory responses to social stressors later in life.

Despite these associations between inflammation and depression symptoms, the degree to which this relationship is causal is still largely unclear. Of the reasons for this, one is that most of the studies examining inflammation are limited to peripheral markers of inflammation, with direct examinations of their connection to processes in the brain being rare. Another is the fact that both depression and inflammation are often confounded with other conditions, allowing for the possibility they both may be caused by other variables rather than one directly causing the other. Of these potential variables, obesity has received the most attention due to findings that BMI often moderates or mediates the link between depression symptoms and inflammation.

=== Comorbidity ===
Although not as strong as a risk factor as social adversity, illness is often associated with depression. Compared to the healthy portion of the US population, those experiencing illness are 5-10 times more likely to experience depression or depression-like symptoms. This association appears to often develop rapidly and is not constrained to individual with the condition, with a large-scale twin study finding that individuals with severe illness or injury had an odds ratio of 3.1 for developing major depression in the first month of their condition and those with an important member in their social network becoming severely ill having an odds ratio of 2.5 over the same time period. However, the increased association between inflammatory responses and depression is not constrained to times around illness, with both infections and autoimmune disorders increasing one's risk of depression later in life.

In addition to its association with illness in general, depression appears to be particularly connected to conditions in which inflammation makes up a substantial part of symptomology. For example, asthma, diabetes, obesity, heart disease, and rheumatoid arthritis are all often co-morbid with depression and characterized by seemingly excessive inflammatory responses. Although much of these symptoms overlap both sickness behavior and depression, symptoms associated solely with depression are also often found, with suicidal ideation and increased anxiety being common in individuals with autoimmune disorders.

=== Anti-inflammatories ===
Although in the early stages of research, there are indications that anti-inflammatories can reduce symptoms in those with depression and mood disorders. While depression symptoms tend to be sensitive to placebo responses, clinical trials have shown that these benefits often outperform placebos when used on their own or in conjunction with anti-depressants, with NSAIDs and cytokine inhibitors each being shown effective by multiple trials. In addition, statins, poly-unsaturated fatty acids, corticosteroids, and anti-inflammatories aimed at specific illnesses all have been shown to have positive effects on depression but in a lesser number of studies.

However, despite initial evidence for the ability of anti-inflammatories to lessen depression symptoms, the diverse nature of methods used in these studies and the risks of side effects have been suggested to warrant caution when considering their potential as depression treatments. The use of NSAIDs in particular, has been cautioned due to concerns their potential side-effects and their potential the interact with or limit the effectiveness of certain antidepressants.

=== Antidepressants ===
Similar to findings that anti-inflammatories may reduce depression symptoms, antidepressants have been shown to reduce inflammation levels. In particular, both selective serotonin reuptake inhibitors (SSRIs) and serotonin–norepinephrine reuptake inhibitors (SNRIs) are often reported to come with both anti-inflammatory and anti-oxidative effects in clinical trials. In addition to this, a smaller number of studies have reported that those who did not respond to antidepressants had higher levels of inflammatory markers than those who the treatments worked for.

== Risk factors ==
Beyond often being associated between with one another, both depression and inflammation are similarly sensitive to external stressors, something which has been used to further argue in favor of their connection. Of the possible types of stressors, those involving social adversity tend to be the most likely to result in depression and are significant predictors of inflammation levels in both experimental and observational studies. This is often seen short term, with inflammation markers often being found to be elevated in response to negative social outcomes and throughout the course of one's depression, with bereaved individuals often experiencing greater inflammation than non-grieving individuals.

Both one's risk of depression and inflammation levels have also been found to be higher in adults who experienced childhood adversity. Similarly, these individuals also face increased risk of autoimmune diseases, which are both indicative of greater inflammatory responses and risk factors for depression. As with the relationship between depression and inflammation as a whole, this relationship is thought to be bidirectional with both depression increasing one's risk of autoimmune disease and autoimmune disease increasing one's risk of depression. However, it is also likely that this connection is also due in part to depression and inflammation sharing many risk factors that may contribute to both conditions.

=== Social support as a protective factor ===
Similar to their shared risk factors, social support has been found to reduce the risk of both depression and pro-inflammatory phenotypes. This is seen with relatively high levels of social support being found to be associated with decreased risk of depression as well as asthma and heart disease, while also being associated with decreased levels of inflammatory markers as a whole following negative social interactions.

== Physiological pathways ==
=== Inflammasomes ===
Of the pathways linking the non-pathogenic stressors associated with depression to inflammation, inflammasome activation has been highlighted as one of the most promising. While major depression is associated with increased inflammasome activation in general, the NLRP3 inflammasome complex has received the most attention in relation to major depression due to both its role in triggering the release of interleukin-1β and interleukin-18 and its association with depression and depression-like symptoms in both humans and non-human animals.

Compared to other inflammasomes, NLPR3 is sensitive to a greater number and variety of stressors and has been shown to result in inflammation without the presence of pathogens. This is possible due to NLPR3's sensitivity to a wide range of danger-associated molecular patterns (DAMPs), which can indicate the presence of various forms noninfectious stressors throughout the body. Due to this sensitivity and NLPR3's role in triggering cytokine release, NLPR3 is thought to be a key component in sterile inflammatory responses, something which has led to the suggestion that it is a likely mechanism linking non-pathogen induced stress to the increased inflammation that is common in depression and other forms of psychological distress.

=== Macrophages ===
It has been argued that depression may be the result of macrophage activity as part of the process of inflammation.

Many of the symptoms of depression are thought to stem from the release of inflammatory cytokines by macrophages in the peripheral and central nervous systems. Cytokines have the potential to impact neural connectivity and neurotransmitter concentrations, subsequently producing physiological alterations in the nervous system and contributing to depressive symptoms. One important inflammatory cytokine, interferon-α (IFN- α), is correlated with the development of depressive symptoms through the overactivation of the hypothalamic-pituitary-adrenal axis (HPA axis) and increased levels of corticotropin-releasing factor (CRF). Increased concentrations of other inflammatory cytokines, including interleukin-1(IL-1; causes inflammatory cascade and abnormal hormone concentration), interleukin-6 (IL-6; activates HPA axis and stimulates stress reaction), and tumor necrosis factor-α (TNF-α; activates HPA axis and impacts serotonergic system), have also been found in depressed individuals.

=== Link between symptoms ===
Compared to the link between external stressors and inflammation, the connection between peripheral inflammation and depression symptoms is better understood. This is due to cytokines being directly involved with inflammatory responses while also serving as a signal that can lead to changes in behavior.

Despite cytokines often being too large to pass through the blood-brain barrier alone, their effect on the central nervous system (CNS) can happen with cytokines entering the CNS in areas where the blood-brain barrier is permeable, by being carried across the blood-brain barrier, or by binding with the cerebral vascular endothelium, thereby signaling the presence of inflammation to the brain. There is also initial evidence that major depression and stress can alter the permeability of the blood-brain barrier, allowing substances which would normally not be able to pass through enter the brain, thereby increasing the ways peripheral inflammation can affect the brain.

Once peripheral cytokines initially communicate the existence of inflammation outside of the CNS, microglia and astrocytes within the CNS are activated and release additional cytokines and chemokines, which then results in the production of neurotransmitters that can contribute to sickness behavior or depression. Although the possibility of maladaptive outcomes due to dysregulation, this connection is largely thought to be adaptive due to the benefits of coordinating the CNS with broader immune processes and due to the role immune function in the brain has in facilitating learning and memory.

== Incomplete connection ==
Despite being associated in many ways, the connection between depression and inflammation is not complete. This is seen in that immune activity does not appear to be enough on its own to cause depression. Evidence for this comes primarily from treatments that involve the pro-inflammatory IFN-α, which is commonly used in treating viral infections but only results in major depression in about one third of patients. Of the reasons why this might be, one suggestion is that symptoms relating to low mood and anxiety are brought about less in patients relative to increases in symptoms relating to reduced activity and appetite suppression, which tend to almost always occur. This has been seen to indicate that depression as a whole cannot be seen as sickness behavior. However, others have suggested the need for approaches that include illness symptoms as a sub-type of depression, with certain types being more connected to inflammation.

In addition to evidence suggesting that inflammation is not sufficient for the development of major depression, evidence for a lack of complete overlap also comes from findings that depression often occurs without existing immune challenges, with social adversity appearing to cause depression without the requirement of underlying inflammation. Similarly, the existence of variation in the degree to which depressed individuals experience inflammation has also been seen to suggest that it is possible that some instances of depression may occur without inflammation. However, it is possible that all instances of depression involve increased inflammation, something which is consistent with the idea that depression may have evolved through the co-option of sickness behavior.

== In animals ==
Although major depression is primarily studied in humans, there is evidence that depression-like symptoms beyond sickness behavior are also seen in non-human animals and that these symptoms often are accompanied by increased inflammation. Primarily seen in experimental studies, these symptoms often take the form of states that appear similar to the helplessness, anxiety, anhedonia, and weight change seen in human depression. However, the degree to which these symptoms are comparable to human symptoms is unknown, with the full suite of cognitive symptoms associated with depression having yet to be found in any study of non-human animals.

Compared to the uncertainty about how the behaviors observed in non-human animals are experienced cognitively, there is much more evidence supporting the connection between inflammation and sickness behavior in non-human animals. As with humans, this is mainly seen experimentally, with injections of pro-inflammatory cytokines often resulting in sickness behavior and occasionally other depression-like symptoms. Likewise, the ability for anti-inflammatories to reduce these symptoms is also seen in experimental studies as is seen in humans.

== Medical explanations ==
=== From immune response ===
One explanation for the connection between inflammation and depression symptoms, is that depression is a disorder that stems from immune responses across the body. Due in large part to the systems that bring them about both involving the same pro-inflammatory cytokines, the suggestion is that strong or prolonged immune responses allow for those with susceptibilities to depression to experience it outside of experiences with any other risk factors. Of the ways this might happen, one is that those whose immune responses have been shifted to be pro-inflammatory without sufficient anti-inflammatory compensation have elevated risk of experiencing inflammation intense enough to cause depression. Another suggestion is that variation in neurotransmitter production or receptors may also play a role in one's risk of experiencing inflammation-based depression if certain combinations result in increased risk of inflammation, similarly putting them at risk of maladaptive changes in brain chemistry.

However, findings that depression and pro-inflammatory responses do not require the presence of the other for one to develop have led others to argue that the two conditions are often distinct, something which has been suggested to reduce the explanation's appeal to psychiatrists.

== Evolutionary explanations ==
=== Pathogen host defense hypothesis ===
One explanation that sees the connection between depression and inflammation as the result of adaptations is the Pathogen Host Defense Hypothesis (PATHOS-D), which proposes that depression is directly tied to immune responses. From this perspective, depression-like symptoms are thought to reduce energy consumption and reallocate resources so that one can mount a stronger immune defense, thereby reducing the organism's risk of death. In addition to this, both the reduction in activity and social withdrawal that often accompanies depression are also suggested to provide benefits by decreasing one's risk of encountering new pathogens or exposing kin or cooperative partners to one's illness, although they are likely of secondary importance.

Beyond serving as an explanation for the connection between depression and inflammation, PATHOS-D was also designed to account for the connection between social stressors and depression. By viewing social adversity as a recurrent cue of likely injury and infection risk across human evolutionary history, social stressors are incorporated into the hypothesis with the expectation that their presence can be used to inform the need to up-regulate immune function before the actual injury or infection risk occurs. As the risk of death in these situations was high ancestrally, false alarms in which social adversity results in one experiencing the costs of depression without any pathogen threat are expected to be common due to the greater costs of failing to respond to an actual threat. Therefore, the benefits of depression in terms of reduced mortality are expected to outweigh the costs of depression throughout our evolutionary history both in terms of false alarms and the costs of depression in general.

Although serving as an explanation for the association between depression and increased inflammation levels, the host-defense hypothesis cannot currently explain many of the symptoms outside of reduced activity or social withdrawal. For example, both depression's connection to suicidality and the fact that depression symptoms often persist outside of illness or after a pathogen has been dealt with suggest that there is more to depression than its role as a coordinated immune defense. However, the host-defense hypothesis is not mutually exclusive with other explanations for these occurrences, and it is possible that illness symptoms can be co-opted for other purposes, such as signaling weakness and need for help.

=== Social signal transduction theory ===
Closely related to the host-defense hypothesis, the Social Signal Transduction Theory of Depression also directly incorporates social stressors into its explanation for the connection between depression and up-regulated immune responses. However, compared to PATHOS-D, it emphasizes the role of depression as the body's way to prepare itself for the threat of future infection to a greater degree. It also differs in that while PATHOS-D still allows for many cases of depression to be adaptive in Western, Industrialized societies, the Social Signal Transduction Theory expects most instances to be maladaptive. This is due to the expectation that much of the cues indicating risk of injury are less relevant now due to both their lesser connection with violence and the fact that modern medicine has greatly reduced one's risk of death or long-term damage from infection.

However, like PATHOS-D, the Social Signal Transduction Theory of Depression has been suggested to be compatible with other explanations, with there being potential for both the cognitive and inflammatory symptoms of depression to be functional in times of social adversity.

=== Immune dysregulation hypothesis ===
Another explanation for the connection between depression and inflammation that emphasizes the role of environmental mismatch is the Immune Dysregulation Hypothesis. The Immune Dysregulation hypothesis is based on the old friends hypothesis, which suggests that Western, sanitary environments fail to provide sufficient microorganism exposure to train the immune system to tolerate safe or difficult to eradicate microorganisms, thereby resulting in greater prevalence of the pro-inflammatory phenotypes that typify autoimmune diseases. As depression is also associated with pro-inflammatory responses, the suggestion is that the causes of depression are little different from the causes of the autoimmune diseases it is largely co-morbid with, with sanitary environments increasing the risk of excessive inflammation in response to psychosocial stressors just as it is thought to with otherwise harmless microorganisms.

However, evidence of increased inflammation among depressed individuals is also seen among the Tsimané, which has been presented as challenge for the Immune Dysregulation Hypothesis' expectation that this association is restricted to Western environments.

=== Co-opted sickness behavior ===
An additional explanation for the overlap in symptoms shared by depression and sickness behavior is that the neurobiology associated with sickness behavior was co-opted to result in melancholic symptoms outside of illness by other adaptations. Based largely on the degree of overlap in symptoms major depression, sickness behavior, and starvation depression share, the argument is that sickness behavior likely evolved first due to its prevalence across animal species and the role infection plays as a major fitness threat. However, once the ability to down-regulate behavior to divert resources for immune function existed, the underlying mechanisms could then be used by other systems. This is thought to then allow for additional adaptations that add cognitive symptoms unique to melancholic depression to those stemming from normal sickness behavior.

Although likely consistent with any explanation of the evolution as major depression as the result of psychological adaptations, Andrews and Durisko present the co-option hypothesis as mainly consistent with the analytical rumination hypothesis. From this perspective, major depression is thought to often result in improved problem solving due to the redistribution of energy away from physical activity for increased rumination. As this is thought to be energetically costly, it therefore functions very similarly to sickness behavior with it both being adaptive for redistributing energy flows, differing primarily in whether increasing energy goes to cognition or immune defense.

== See also ==
- Psychoneuroimmunology
- Evolutionary approaches to depression
- Social predictors of depression
- Biology of depression
