= Smiling depression =

Act of masking depression

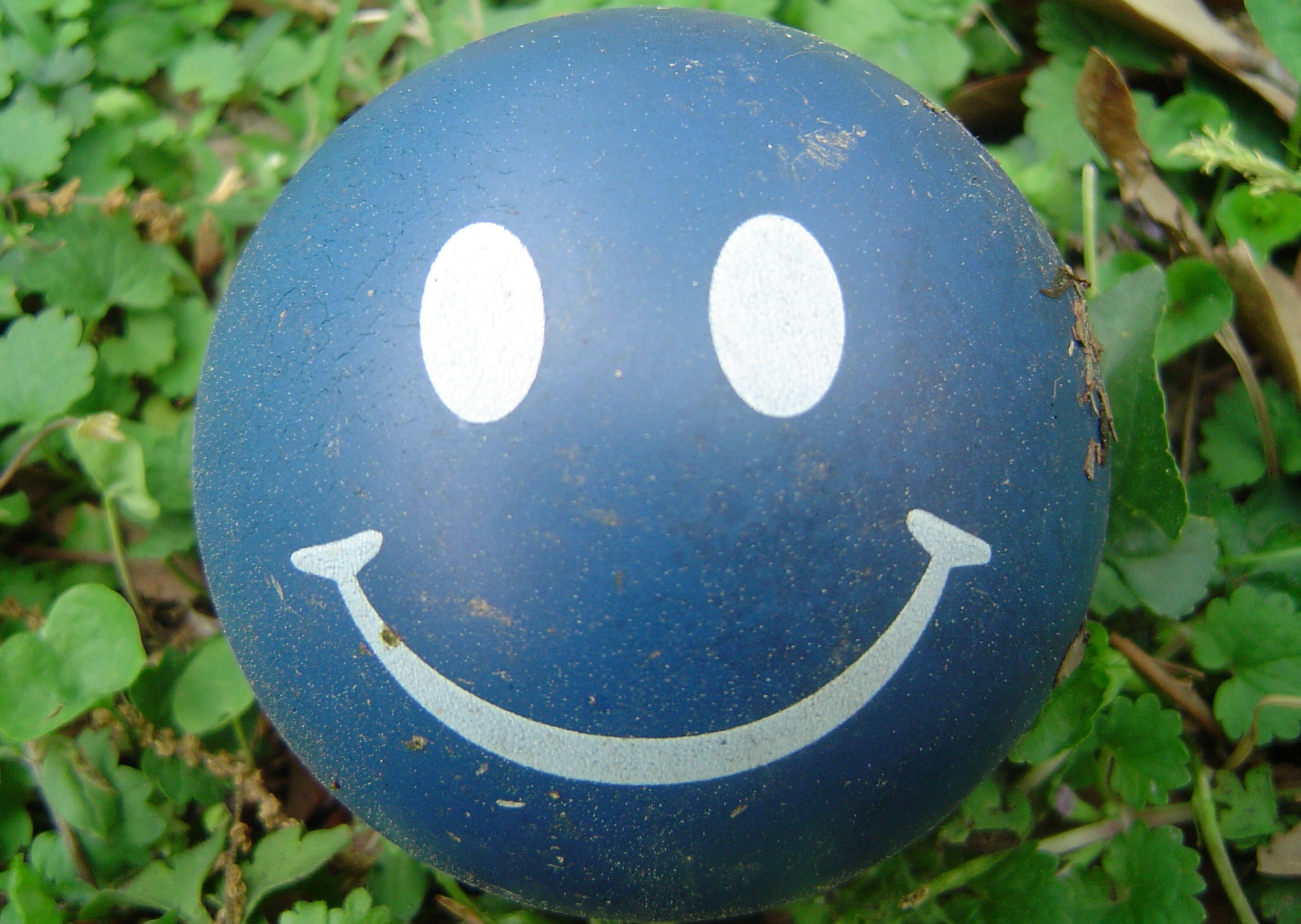
- A symbolical representation of a person covering or masking their depression with smiling or joyful expressions
- Symptoms: Low mood, low self-esteem, loss of interest or pleasure, and other
- Complications: Suicide
- Usual onset: Ages 8 to any age (if left untreated without therapy)
- Duration: 2 weeks or a few months
- Causes: Major life changes
- Risk factors: Depression, Family history, Low mood
- Differential diagnosis: Sad emotions,
- Treatment: Cognitive Behavioural Therapy (CBT), Acceptance and Commitment Therapy (ACT), and medication
- Frequency: 15–40% (lifetime risk)
- Deaths: approximately 15% (from suicide)

Smiling depression is a mental disorder which is linked to Major depressive disorder (MDD), and it revolves around depression but the person who has it decides to cover or mask it with fake Happiness, smiling, and enthusiastic expressions. Smiling depression can lead to low mood, low self-esteem, and loss of interest or pleasure which can last for 2 weeks, or can last for months or years if left untreated without therapy.

Smiling depression is an unofficial term due to it being not being an official medical diagnosis and the symptoms of smiling depression are typically diagnosed as Major Depressive Disorder (MDD) with atypical features and it is not in the Diagnostic and Statistical Manual of Mental Disorders (DSM-5) handbook due to it being diagnosed as Major depressive disorder. People with Smiling depression will mask their depression with joyful and cheerful expressions while hiding their depression not letting people know that they have it. Just like depression, it can lead to Suicide, low moods, sadness, and other emotions, but the low moods and sadness is not expressed by the person who has Smiling depression due to them hiding or masking it, but they are highly functional and active since they are masking their depression with cheerful expressions. Smiling depression is one of the most dangerous types of depression since it can lead to high risk of suicide.

== Description ==
Smiling depression is where an individual with depression masks their depression with smiling, cheerful, or joyful expressions. This is done to hide knowledge of their depression from others, and they will continue their habitual practices, spend time with their family and friends, and keep their depression to themselves, leading to a higher risk of Suicide.

About 15 to 40% of people have smiling depression, which is common amongst teenagers, young adults, and adults in their 40s.

Women are diagnosed with smiling depression three times more often than men. In practice however, the condition poses significant risks for men due to differences in how they express distress, given its link to major depressive disorder.

Before masking their symptoms, an individual decides whether to conceal their depression behind a smile; once they do, it becomes difficult to recognize that they are depressed.

== Signs and symptoms ==
It is difficult to see if there is any signs of depression in smiling depression since it is covered with regular expressions and they will be highly functional and active doing their work job, around family, and friends and they are faking happiness which can make it difficult to see if they have depression. They do this so nobody knows that they have depression and hide it to themselves not letting people know that they have it which if left untreated without therapy, Smiling depression can last for Weeks, months, years, or even decades.

Smiling depression can lead to Suicide, suicidal ideation (or suicidal thoughts, or suicidal ideas). Most symptoms are mostly emotion symptoms but are also medical symptoms mostly related to sad emotions and depressed feelings. If covering the depression, it can lead to burnouts and could cause even worse issues with it. Smiling depression is difficult to find if the person has depression because they are hiding it with a fake smile, they will go out and do their work job or job, and act like that they have a normal life, not letting people realise that they have depression.

== Causes ==
Most causes of smiling depression is linked to Major depressive disorder (MDD) which can lead to smiling depression. Major life changes can cause smiling depression due to the person moving to a new town or city that is unfamiliar or something that they miss, for example, an object that is important to the person who has smiling depression but the object was accidentally thrown out. Family history can also be the cause of Smiling depression due to one of the family members had depression at the time and is developing again.

== Smiling depression in children and adolescents ==
Just like adults with Smiling depression, it can happen to children and adolescents at any age ranging from 8 to 19 years of age and it can lead to suicide or suicidal thoughts. This can happen from fear of failure, social stigma and bullying, self-hatred over small tiny mistakes, physical complaints such as headaches, stomach pain, and more. If these types of things happen, they will mask their depression with smiling and joyful and cheerful expressions. Children and teenagers act similar to adults with Smiling depression but with different types of expressions but it maybe more noticeable in children and teenagers rather then adults possibly due to children and teenagers discussing what's happening in life and with their depression.

== Research ==
Neurobiologically, smiling depression involves structural or chemical dysregulation in brain pathways, specifically an imbalance between the amygdala (which processes the emotional threats and sadness) and the prefrontal cortex (which governs executive control, willpower, and emotional suppression).

== Treatment ==
Although smiling depression is an unofficial name for a clinical condition, just like Major depressive disorder (MDD) and High functioning depression, therapy is a useful treatment for smiling depression like Cognitive Behavioural Therapy (CBT), Acceptance and Commitment Therapy (ACT) and medication could be an effective treatment method which can slowly stop smiling depression. These treatments can possibly be helpful just like Talk therapy, since the person with Smiling depression is discussing about their depression, about how they dont like themselves, or other related problems with it.

== See also ==
- Depression (mood)
- Major depressive disorder
