= Behavioral theories of depression =

Behavioral theories of depression explain the etiology of depression based on the behavioural sciences; adherents promote the use of behavioral therapies for depression.

== Behavioral theories ==
=== Introduction ===
Depression is a significant mental illness with physiological and psychological consequences, including sluggishness, diminished interest and pleasure, and disturbances in sleep and appetite. It is predicted that by the year 2030, depression will be the number one cause of disability in the United States and other high-income countries.

Behavioral theories of depression emphasize the role maladaptive actions play in the onset and maintenance of depression. These theories stem from work concerning the principles of learning and conditioning from the early to mid-1900s. Ivan Pavlov and B. F. Skinner are often credited with the establishment of behavioral psychology with their research on classical conditioning and operant conditioning, respectively. Collectively, their research established that certain behaviors could be learned or unlearned, and these theories have been applied in a variety of contexts, including abnormal psychology. Theories specifically applied to depression emphasize the reactions individuals have to their environment and how they develop adaptive or maladaptive coping strategies.

=== Behavioral activation ===
Behavioral activation (BA) is an idiographic and functional approach to depression. It argues that people with depression act in ways that maintain their depression and locates the origin of depressive episodes in the environment. While BA theories do not deny biological factors that contribute to depression, they assert that it is ultimately the combination of a stressful event in an individual's life and their reaction to the event that produces a depressive episode. Individuals with depression may display socially aversive behaviors, fail to engage in enjoyable activities, ruminate on their problems, or engage in other maladaptive activities. According to BA theory, these behaviors most often function as avoidance mechanisms while the individual tries to cope with a stressful life event, resulting in a decrease in positive reinforcers or perceived control. Rumination is particularly important in the onset of depression. There are two main coping mechanisms, rumination and distraction. Ruminators spend time focusing on the stressful event and their feelings, while distractors engage in activities that distance them from the event and their feelings. Ruminators are much more likely to become depressed than distractors.

=== Social skills ===
Deficits in social skills and positive social interactions have been empirically proven to be main contributors to the maintenance of depression. Individuals with depression typically interact with others less frequently than non-depressed persons, and their actions are typically more dysfunctional. One theory of social skills revolves around the lack of interaction-seeking behaviors displayed by the depressed individual. This lack of interaction results in social isolation that furthers the development of a negative self-concept, loneliness, and isolation. An alternative social skills theory attributes problems within interactions with the maintenance of depression. The "pro-happiness social norm" causes people to approach social interactions with the expectation of a positive exchange; however, individuals with depression typically violate these expectations. The lack of responsiveness displayed by individuals with depression becomes annoying to their interaction partners, causing the interaction partners to either avoid interactions with the depressed individual or to approach them more negatively in future interactions, generating a self-fulfilling prophecy of continued negative social interactions for both individuals. The depressed individual often sends ambiguous social cues that result in a misinterpretation by their interaction partner, such as a lack of responsiveness that can be interpreted as personal aversion. This misinterpretation leads to a decrease of positive interactions, resulting in a further decrease in social interactions, facilitating the maintenance of depression.

=== Reinforcement contingencies ===
Reinforcement contingencies theory asserts that depression results from a loss of adequate reward contingencies. Specifically, when positive behaviors are no longer rewarded in ways that are perceived to be adequate, those behaviors occur less frequently and, eventually, become extinct. The eventual extinction of a large spectrum of behaviors reduces the behavioral repertoire of the individual, resulting in the lack of responsiveness and arousal associated with depression. The loss or ineffectiveness of reinforcement can be attributed to a variety of causes:

- The reinforcing event may be removed. This is typically related to the loss of an important or rewarding role, such as a job.
- The behavioral capabilities of the affected individual may be reduced. This relates to the ability the individual has to perform activities that previously elicited positive reinforcement. This may be affected by such events as a traumatic injury or event.
- The number of events that are rewarding may be reduced. This is typically linked to the biological aspects of depression, including a deficit in serotonin and dopamine that results in reduction of positive emotions during previously rewarding experiences.

After the removal of reinforcers, the affected individual begins to interpret their behavior as meaningless due to the lack of obvious consequences. This interpreted lack of control in a given domain is typically generalized, developing into learned helplessness. Learned helplessness is defined as a sense of having no control over outcomes, regardless of one's actions. This may mediate the emergence of the lack of responsiveness and arousal observed in persons with depression after a perceived change in positive reinforcers.

==== Self-regulation ====
Self-regulation is a sub-category of reinforcement contingency theories. Self-regulation theories emphasize the role of self-implemented reinforcers and environment-dependent reinforcers. These self-implemented reinforcers may explain why some individuals who experience an external loss develop depression and others do not. Self-regulation begins with a self-evaluation in which the person recalls past performances and monitors their actions, followed by a reward or punishment. Individuals with depression may have unrealistic expectations for themselves, resulting in extreme self-punishment, or alternatively, may not engage in self-regulatory behaviors, depending completely on external sources of reinforcement. In either circumstance, the individual limits their experiences of positive enforcers, leading to a preoccupancy with negative feelings and depression.

=== Cognitive behavioral therapy ===
Cognitive behavioral therapy (CBT) is based on the assumption that depression has its roots in negative thought patterns that then result in negative behavior patterns. Aaron Beck is cited as the first to develop this cognitive-behavioral approach, focusing on the here and now rather than predisposing factors. Beck's theories are based on his cognitive triad: a negative view of self, the world, and the future. Individuals with depression have unwarranted negative views of themselves and the world and, consequently, have overly negative expectations for the future. These negative expectations result in aversive behaviors; however, the behaviors are only a symptom of the original cognitive misconceptions.

=== Personality ===
Personality is defined as consistent patterns of thoughts, feelings, and behaviors. Beck revised his original cognitive-behavioral theory to include predisposing personality types, which have been expanded upon by other cognitive-behavioral therapists. Silvano Arieti and Jules Bemporad link these consistent patterns of thought and behavior with the development of depression. . When individuals with this personality type fail to meet the expectations of those others, they become vulnerable to the development of depression. Alternatively, individuals with the dominant goal personality value personal achievement and success. These individuals become vulnerable to depression when they realize that they cannot or have not reached their goals. More generally, depression has been linked to differences in attributional styles and affect. Negative affect, the tendency to react negatively and to be overly sensitive to negative stimuli, predisposes individuals to depression. Conversely, positive affect, the tendency to react positively and to maintain high energy levels and high amounts of positive emotion, may serve as a buffer against depression. Additionally, the tendency to make negative internal attributions predisposes individuals to the development of hopelessness and depression. The opposite effect is seen for those who make positive internal attributions.

=== Social psychological social environment theory of depression ===
According to social psychologist Wendy Treynor, depression happens when one is trapped in a social setting that rejects the self, on a long-term basis (where one is devalued continually), and this rejection is internalized into self-rejection, winning one rejection from both the self and group— social rejection and self-rejection, respectively. This chronic conflict seems inescapable, and depression sets in. Stated differently, according to Treynor, the cause of depression is as follows: One's state of harmony is disrupted when faced with external conflict (social rejection) for failing to measure up to a group's standard(s). Over time, this social rejection is internalized into self-rejection, where one experiences rejection from both the group and the self. Therefore, the rejection seems inescapable and depression sets in. In this framework, depression is conceptualized as being the result of long-term conflict (internal and external), where this conflict corresponds to self-rejection and social rejection, respectively, or the dual needs for self-esteem (self-acceptance) and belonging (social acceptance) being unmet, on a long-term basis. The solution to depression offered, therefore, is to end the conflict (get these needs met): Navigate oneself into an unconditionally accepting social environment, so one can internalize this social acceptance into self-acceptance, winning one peace both internally and externally (through self-acceptance and social acceptance—self-esteem and belonging, respectively), ending the conflict, and the depression.

But what if one cannot find an unconditionally accepting group to navigate oneself into? If one cannot find such a group, the solution the framework offers is to make the context in which one generally finds oneself the self (however, the self must be in meditative solitude—alone and at peace, not lonely and ruminating—as stated, a state commonly achieved through the practice of meditation). The framework suggests that a lack of self-acceptance lies at the root of depression and that one can heal their own depression if they (a) keep an alert eye to their own emotional state (i.e., identify feelings of shame or depression) and (b) upon identification, take reparative action: undergo a context shift and immerse oneself in a new group that is unconditionally accepting (accepts the self, as it is)—whether that group is one that exists apart from the self or simply is the self [in meditative solitude]. Over time, the unconditional acceptance experienced in this setting will be internalized, allowing one to achieve self-acceptance, eradicating conflict, eliminating one's depression.

=== Helplessness and hopelessness theories of depression ===
In 1848, George Washington Burnap wrote that the "grand essentials to happiness" were "something to do, something to love and something to hope for."

In 1958, Fritz Heider (with the help of Beatrice Wright) wrote "The Psychology of Interpersonal Relations", which pioneered attribution theory. This theory explains the importance of how someone consciously attributes the causes of events in their life.

In 1972, Martin Seligman's learned helplessness theory of depression posited that if someone finds that their actions don't appear to help resolve their problems, they learn they are helpless, and this will cause them to become depressed. However, others found that this theory didn't account for different people in similarly helpless situations having differing levels of depression.

In 1974, Aaron T. Beck, Arlene Weissman, David Lester and Larry Trexler published a "hopelessness scale".

In 1976, Beck released Beck's cognitive triad. This triad posits the importance of "automatic, spontaneous and seemingly uncontrollable negative thoughts" about the self, the world/environment, and the future.

In 1978, Lyn Yvonne Abramson, Seligman and John D. Teasdale reformulated Seligman's 1972 work, using Heider's attribution theory. They proposed that people differed in how they classified negative experiences on three scales, from internal to external, stable to unstable, and from global to specific. They believed that people who were more likely to attribute negative events to internal, stable, and global causes were more likely to become depressed than those attributed things to causes at the other ends of the scales.

In 1979, Beck, Augustus John Rush, Brian Shaw and Gary Emery published the book "Cognitive therapy of depression", which had the cognitive triad as a major underpinning concept. This mode of therapy became a major part of cognitive behavioral therapy in the 1980s, which became the standard non-pharmaceutical treatment for depression.

In 1988, Beck's "hopelessness scale" of 1974 was redeveloped into the first edition of the Beck Hopelessness Scale. This soon became the standard measure of hopelessness, though it was less used than the long existing Beck Depression Inventory.

In 1988 and 1989, Abramson, Gerald Metalsky, Lauren Alloy and Shirley Hartlage revised Abramson's 1978 work, and named the results the "hopelessness theory of depression". They believed that "hopelessness depression" was a subtype of depression, and that it was not inclusive of all depression.

In 1992, Donna Rose and Abramson published a paper emphasising the importance of childhood experiences on setting someone's positions on the internal, stable, and global attributional scales.

In 2002, John Abela and Sabina Sarin found that if someone was at the far depressive end of any of the three attributional scales, they would likely become depressed. There was no anti-depressive benefit from being higher on the other two. They called this the "weakest link hypothesis."

In 2006, Catherine Panzarella, Alloy and Wayne Whitehouse published an "Expanded Hopelessness Theory of Depression". This expanded on the 1989 theory, noting the importance of social support in an individual's defence against depression. In particular, "adaptive inferential feedback" was deemed to be especially important. This is feedback given to someone that defines the cause of a negative event as external, unstable and specific - the kind of thinking that leads away from depression.

== Behavioral therapies ==
Behavior therapy, also known as behavior modification, is a sub-category of psychotherapy. The emphasis is placed on observable, measurable behavior and the alteration of maladaptive behaviors via rewards and punishment. Behavior therapies for depression first emerged in the mid-1960s with Saslow's positive group reinforcement, which focused on increasing social skills. Three alternative therapies emerged over the next 4 years: Lewinsohn's social learning theory, Patterson's anti-depression milieu, and Lazarus' behavioral deprivation. Social learning theory focused on identifying and avoiding behaviors that increased depressive thoughts. Anti-depression milieu encouraged catharsis to overcome depression. Behavioral deprivation therapy denied patients any stimulus for an extended period of time, positing that any future stimulus would elicit positive feelings. Though none of these therapies are practiced in their original form, they formed the basis for all behavioral therapies in use today. Behavioral therapy has been shown to be as effective as cognitive therapy and antidepressants in the treatment of depression. The benefits of behavioral therapy have also been shown to persist after the end of therapy.

=== Behavioral activation therapy ===
Behavioral activation therapy emphasizes the role of the individual in creating treatment goals and engaging with their environment in a way that facilitates positive reinforcement. Treatment is typically intended to be brief, intense, and specific to the goals of the individual. Goals are specific and measurable, focusing on single avoidance behaviors. Patients keep activity logs to monitor the feelings associated with different activities and therapists assign graded homework to help patients accomplish their goals. Patients are encouraged to participate in activities that they find pleasurable and to avoid activities that generate feelings of depression. Engaging in more diverse and positively reinforcing activities will, over time, rebuild the individual's behavioral repertoire, providing more variability in their responses and actions. This variability has been linked to a decrease in depressive symptoms and to a typical behavioral profile. The ultimate goal is to engage the individual in a wide range of stable and meaningful reinforcers, consequently alleviating depressive symptoms.

==== Functional analysis ====
Functional analysis is defined as "the identification of important, controllable, causal functional relationships applicable to a specified set of target behaviors for an individual" and is used for individual evaluation in behavioral activation therapy. In functional analysis, the purpose of the behavior is emphasized in relation to the individual and their environment, i.e. if the behavior is avoidant, rather than the actual topography of the action. Functional analysis is based on the evaluation of an event via the three-term contingency: antecedents, behavior, and consequences. An antecedent is an event that increases the likelihood of a given behavior, the behavior is the individual's response to the antecedent, and the consequence is the reinforcement or lack thereof. Therapists help individuals identify events that typically trigger specific behaviors and the consequences of these behaviors. Then the individual is encouraged to interrupt the three-term contingency pattern for negative consequences by either avoiding the antecedent or changing the behavior. Likewise, individuals are encouraged to seek out antecedents that result in positive reinforcement and to increase the behaviors for which they are positively reinforced.

=== Social skills training ===
Social skills training includes all therapies that teach adaptive interaction skills. Training may be specific to a given situation, such as a job interview, or may be more general in nature. Therapists often engage individuals in behavioral rehearsal, a process in which the client practices appropriate social skills for a given situation with the therapist.

==== Social problem solving ====
In social problem solving therapy, therapists help individuals develop adaptive coping mechanisms for daily life stresses, such as confrontation and discomfort, within a social environment. Emphasis is placed on manipulating the individual's responses to social stressors, as well as ways to avoid excessively stressful social situations. There is no pre-determined set of adaptive behaviors, rather, coping mechanisms are created on an individual basis.

===== Problem solving therapy =====
Problem orientation therapy (PST) is a sub-category of social problem solving therapy that focuses on changing the manner in which individuals approach social stressors. Problem orientation is an individual's generalized cognitive approach to social problems and coping. Individuals with depression typically display a negative problem orientation, the tendency to become overwhelmed by social stressors and perceive them to be unsolvable, resulting in maladaptive coping. PST emphasizes decreasing negative orientations, increasing positive orientations, enhancing problem-solving skills, and minimizing avoidant and impulsive reactions. Individuals are provided with a series of steps to manipulate their orientation and reaction: the SSTA Toolkit. Therapists instruct clients to stop, slow down, think, and act to encourage rational behavior that is influenced by cognitive processes rather than emotional reactions. The emphasis is placed on generating behavioral modifications that interrupt the individual's typical progression of negative orientation and maladaptive coping, replacing them with positive orientation and useful coping behaviors.

== See also ==
- Clinical psychology
- Major depressive disorder
