= Circadian depression =

New type of depression linked to Major depressive disorder

- Specialty: Psychiatry
- Symptoms: Long sleep duration, depressed mood particularly in the morning
- Causes: Disruption to 24-hour sleep cycle
- Treatment: Phototherapy

Circadian depression is a type of depression that is a newly proposed subtype of major depression linked to disruptions in the body's 24-hour internal clock. Circadian depression is currently the newest type of depression discovered and identified in Australia on 21 October 2026 from studies.

The causes of Circadian depression is from disruptions from the body's 24-hour internal clock.

== Signs and symptoms ==
People with this type of newly discovered depression will struggle immensely with morning schedules. People will go through a depressive episode in their long periods of sleep which is usually 10+ hours. People with this type of depression will feel more worse in the mornings experiencing depression, low mood, low energy, and dread. With this type of depression, there is a notable higher rate of suicide ideation. This type of new depression is linked to Major depressive disorder (MDD).

== History ==
Circadian depression was discovered and identified in Australia on 21 October 2026 from studies at the University of Sydney’s Brain and Mind Centre. The team identified the subtype by evaluating a massive dataset of 11,380 individuals from the Australian Genetics of Depression Study, discovering that nearly 23% of the participants fit this specific biological profile.

== Treatment ==
Bright light therapy helps with the depression with a strong photic signal. Behavioural routines and environmental adaptations may also help. Melatonergic antidepressant agomelatine may help with the disruption of circadian rhythm and low mood.

== See also ==
- Depression (mood)
- Major depressive disorder
- Seasonal affective disorder
