= Depression (mood) =

State of low mood and aversion to activity

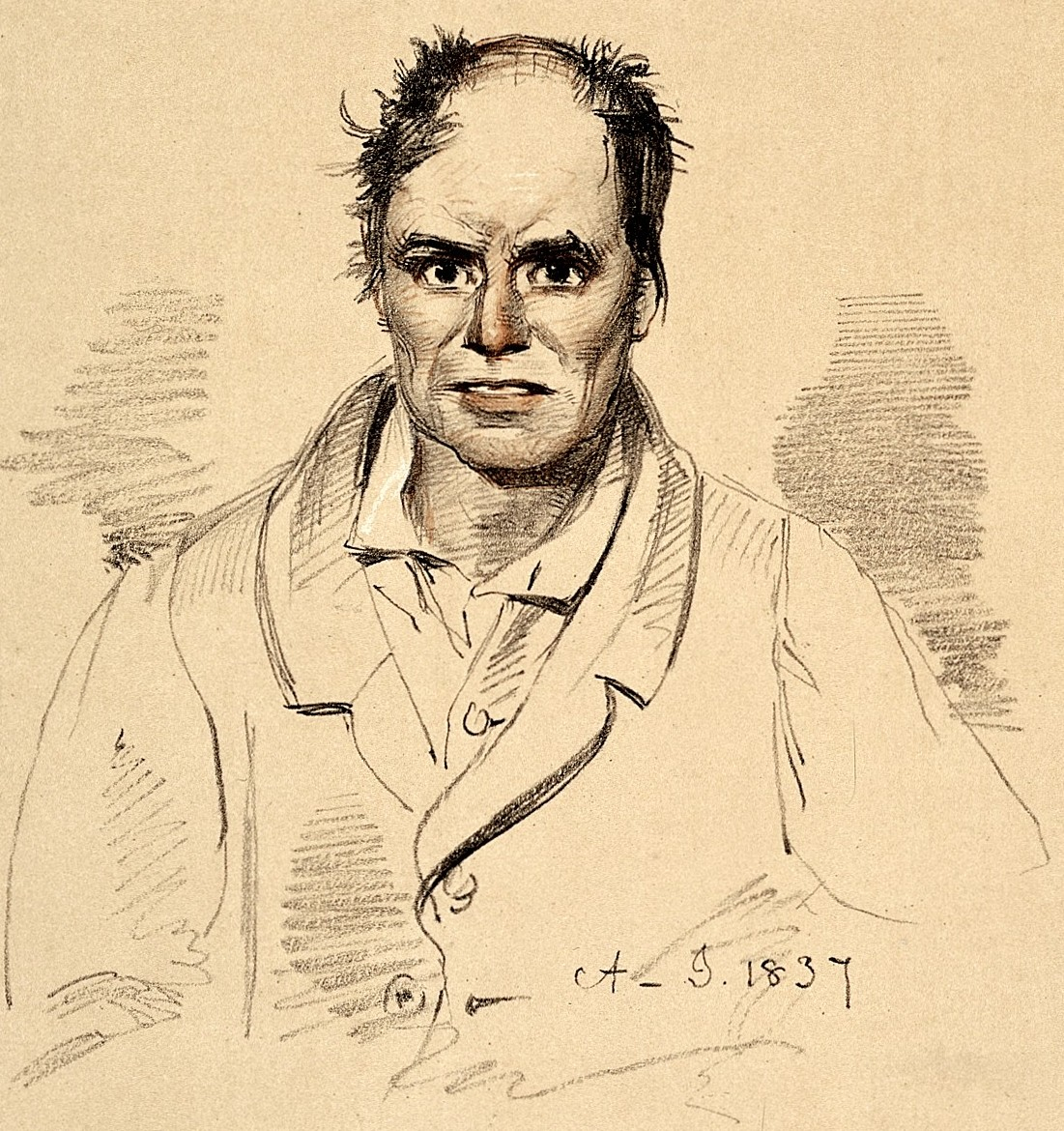
- Lithograph of a person diagnosed with melancholia and strong suicidal tendency in 1892
- Specialty: Psychiatry, psychology
- Symptoms: Low mood, aversion to activity, loss of interest, loss of feeling pleasure
- Causes: Brain chemistry, genetics, life events, medical conditions, personality
- Risk factors: Stigma of mental health disorder
- Diagnostic method: Patient Health Questionnaire, Beck Depression Inventory
- Differential diagnosis: Anxiety, bipolar disorder, borderline personality disorder
- Prevention: Social connections, physical activity
- Treatment: Psychotherapy, psychopharmacology

Depression is a mental state of low mood and aversion to activity. It affects about 3.5% of the global population, or about 280 million people worldwide, as of 2020. Depression affects a person's thoughts, behavior, feelings, and sense of well-being. The pleasure or joy that a person gets from certain experiences is reduced, and the afflicted person often experiences a loss of motivation or interest in those activities. People with depression may experience sadness, feelings of dejection or lack of hope, difficulty in thinking and concentration, hypersomnia or insomnia, overeating or anorexia, or suicidal thoughts.

Depression can have multiple, sometimes overlapping, origins. Depression can be a normal temporary reaction to life events, such as the loss of a loved one. Additionally, depression can be a symptom of some mood disorders, such as major depressive disorder, bipolar disorder, and dysthymia. Depression is also a symptom of some physical diseases and a side effect of some drugs and medical treatments.

== Contributing factors ==
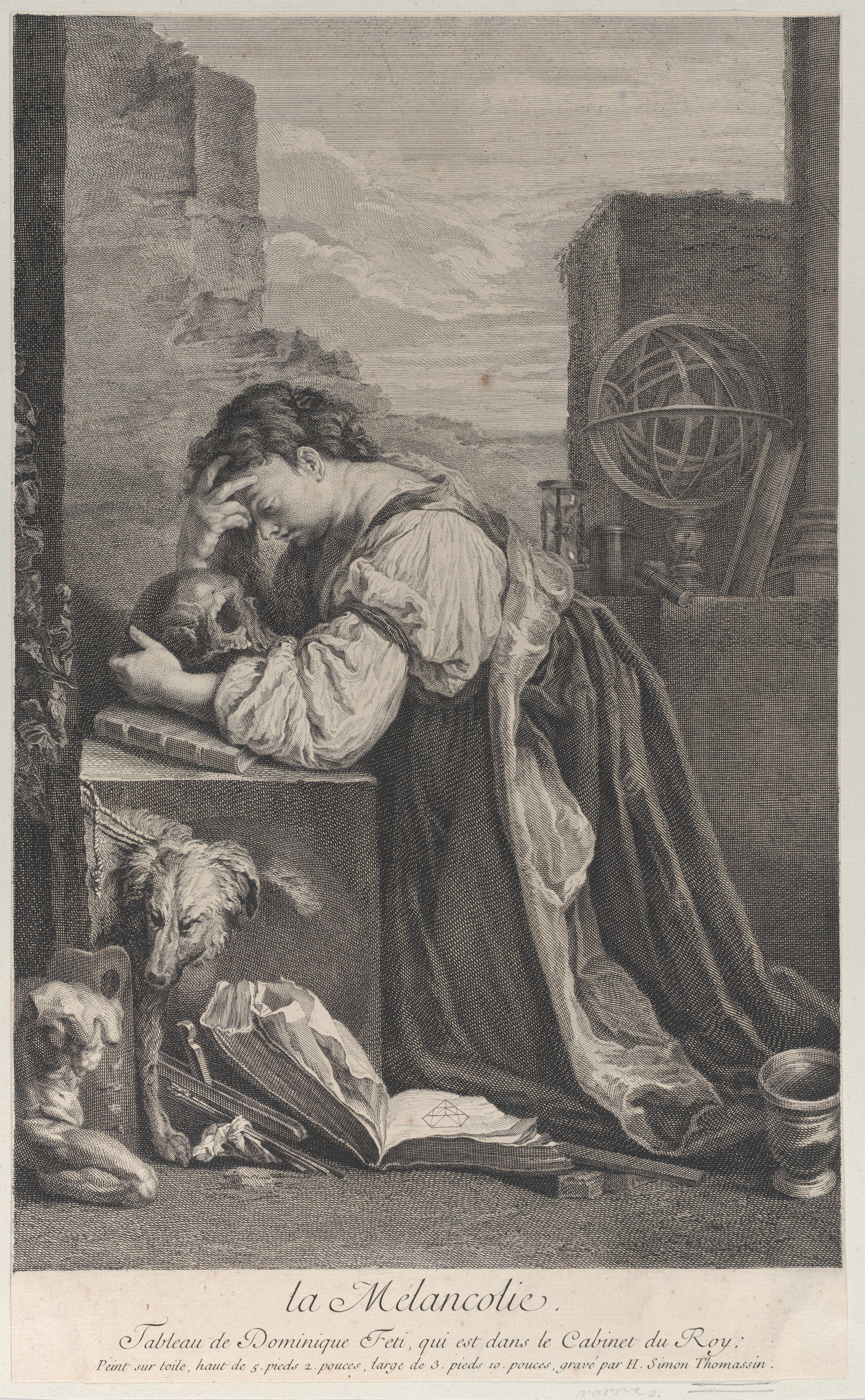
Allegory on melancholy, from c. 1729–1740, etching and engraving, in the Metropolitan Museum of Art (New York City)

=== Life events ===
Adversity in childhood, such as bereavement, neglect, mental abuse, physical abuse, sexual abuse, or unequal parental treatment of siblings, can contribute to depression in adulthood. Childhood physical or sexual abuse in particular significantly correlates with the likelihood of experiencing depression over the survivor's lifetime. People who have experienced four or more adverse childhood experiences are 3.2 to 4.0 times more likely to have depression. Poor housing quality, non-functionality, lack of green spaces, and exposure to air pollution and noise are linked to depressive moods, emphasizing the need for consideration in planning to prevent such outcomes. Locality has also been linked to depression and other negative moods. The rate of depression among those who reside in large urban areas is shown to be lower than those who do not. Likewise, those from smaller towns and rural areas tend to have higher rates of depression, anxiety, and psychological unwellness.

Studies have consistently shown that physicians have had the highest depression and suicide rates compared to people in many other lines of work—for suicide, 40% higher for male physicians and 130% higher for female physicians.

Life events and changes that may cause depressed mood includes, but are not limited to, childbirth, perimenopause, menopause, financial difficulties, unemployment, stress (such as from work, education, military service, family, living conditions, marriage, etc.), a medical diagnosis (cancer, HIV, diabetes, etc.), bullying, loss of a loved one, natural disasters, social isolation, rape, relationship troubles, jealousy, separation, or catastrophic injury. Similar depressive symptoms are associated with survivor's guilt. Adolescents may be especially prone to experiencing a depressed mood following social rejection, peer pressure, or bullying. A 2025 cross-sectional study that analyzed data from the US National Health Interview Survey found that individuals who experience discrimination are more likely to have a positive depression screening compared to those who don't experience discrimination. The extent of the correlation between discrimination and depression depends on race and ethnicity. However, the authors found that it does not depend on sex.

=== Work and depression ===
A body of high-quality longitudinal research has linked adverse working to increased depressive symptoms and disorders. Workplace stressors that increase depression risk include excessive workloads, little autonomy, an unfavorable effort-reward imbalance, and workplace bullying.

=== Childhood and adolescence ===
Depression in childhood and adolescence is similar to adult major depressive disorder, although young sufferers may exhibit increased irritability or behavioral dyscontrol instead of the more common sad, empty, or hopeless feelings seen with adults. Children who are under stress, experiencing loss or grief, or have other underlying disorders are at a higher risk for depression. Depression in young people is often comorbid with mental disorders outside of other mood disorders, most commonly anxiety disorders, especially social anxiety disorder, and conduct disorder. Depression also tends to run in families.

=== Personality ===
Depression is associated with low extraversion, and people who have high levels of neuroticism are more likely to experience depressive symptoms and are more likely to receive a diagnosis of a depressive disorder. Additionally, depression is associated with low conscientiousness. Some factors that may arise from low conscientiousness include disorganization and dissatisfaction with life. Individuals may be more exposed to stress and depression as a result of these factors.

=== LGBT ===
About 60% of LGBTQ youth has reported to feel sad, depressed, or hopeless almost every day for 2 weeks or more in the last year, compared to 26% in the general population.

=== Side effect of medical treatment ===
It is possible that some early generation beta-blockers induce depression in some patients, though the evidence for this is weak and conflicting. There is strong evidence for a link between alpha interferon therapy and depression. One study found that a third of alpha interferon-treated patients had developed depression after three months of treatment. (Beta interferon therapy appears to have no effect on rates of depression.) There is moderately strong evidence that finasteride when used in the treatment of alopecia increases depressive symptoms in some patients. Evidence linking isotretinoin, an acne treatment, to depression is strong. Other medicines that seem to increase the risk of depression include anticonvulsants, antimigraine drugs, and hormonal agents such as gonadotropin-releasing hormone agonist.

=== Substance-induced ===
Several drugs of abuse can cause or exacerbate depression, whether in intoxication, withdrawal, and from chronic use. These include alcohol, sedatives (including prescription benzodiazepines), opioids (including prescription pain killers and illicit drugs such as heroin), stimulants (such as cocaine and amphetamines), hallucinogens, and inhalants.

=== Non-psychiatric illnesses ===
Depressed mood can be the result of a number of infectious diseases, nutritional deficiencies, neurological conditions, and physiological problems, including hypoandrogenism (in men), Addison's disease, Cushing's syndrome, pernicious anemia, hypothyroidism, hyperparathyroidism, Lyme disease, multiple sclerosis, Parkinson's disease, celiac disease, chronic pain, stroke, diabetes, cancer, and HIV. Autistic burnout may also be misdiagnosed as depression.

Studies have found that anywhere from 30 to 85 percent of patients suffering from chronic pain are also clinically depressed. A 2014 study by Hooley et al. concluded that chronic pain increased the chance of death by suicide by two to three times. In 2017, the British Medical Association found that 49% of UK chronic pain patients also had depression.

As many as 1/3 of stroke survivors will later develop post-stroke depression. Because strokes may cause damage to the parts of the brain involved in processing emotions, reward, and cognition, stroke may be considered a direct cause of depression.

=== Psychiatric syndromes ===
A number of psychiatric syndromes feature depressed mood as a main symptom. The mood disorders are a group of disorders considered to be primary disturbances of mood. These include major depressive disorder (commonly called major depression or clinical depression) where a person has at least two weeks of depressed mood or a loss of interest or pleasure in nearly all activities; and dysthymia, a state of chronic depressed mood, the symptoms of which do not meet the severity of a major depressive episode. Another mood disorder, bipolar disorder, features one or more episodes of abnormally elevated mood, cognition, and energy levels, but may also involve one or more episodes of depression. Individuals with bipolar depression are often misdiagnosed with unipolar depression. When the course of depressive episodes follows a seasonal pattern, the disorder (major depressive disorder, bipolar disorder, etc.) may be described as a seasonal affective disorder.

Outside the mood disorders: borderline personality disorder often features an extremely intense depressive mood; adjustment disorder with depressed mood is a psychological response to an identifiable event or stressor, in which the resulting emotional or behavioral symptoms are significant but do not meet the criteria for a major depressive episode; and posttraumatic stress disorder, a mental disorder that sometimes follows trauma, is commonly accompanied by depressed mood.

=== Inflammation ===
Inflammatory processes can be triggered by negative cognition or their consequences, such as stress, violence, or deprivation. Negative cognition may therefore contribute to inflammation, which in turn can lead to depression. A 2019 meta-analysis found that chronic inflammation is associated with a 30% increased risk of developing major depressive disorder, supporting the link between inflammation and mental health.

=== Historical legacy ===
Research suggests possible associations between Neanderthal genetics and some forms of depression.

Authors and researchers have begun to conceptualize ways in which the historical legacies of racism and colonialism may create depressive conditions. Given the lived experiences of marginalized peoples, ranging from conditions of migration, class stratification, cultural genocide, labor exploitation, and social immobility, depression can be seen as a "rational response to global conditions", according to Ann Cvetkovich.

Psychogeographical depression overlaps somewhat with the theory of "deprejudice", a portmanteau of "depression" and "prejudice" proposed by Cox, Abramson, Devine, and Hollon in 2012, who argue for an integrative approach to studying the often comorbid experiences. Cox, Abramson, Devine, and Hollon are concerned with the ways in which social stereotypes are often internalized, creating negative self-stereotypes that then produce depressive symptoms.

Unlike the theory of "deprejudice", a psychogeographical theory of depression attempts to broaden study of the subject beyond an individual experience to one produced on a societal scale, seeing particular manifestations of depression as rooted in dispossession; historical legacies of genocide, slavery, and colonialism are productive of segregation, both material and psychic material deprivation, and concomitant circumstances of violence, systemic exclusion, and lack of access to legal protections. The demands of navigating these circumstances compromise the resources available to a population to seek comfort, health, stability, and sense of security. The historical memory of this trauma conditions the psychological health of future generations, making psychogeographical depression an intergenerational experience as well.

This work is supported by recent studies in genetic science which has demonstrated an epigenetic link between the trauma suffered by Holocaust survivors and genetic reverberations in subsequent generations.

== Measures ==
Measures of depression include, but are not limited to: Beck Depression Inventory-11 and the 9-item depression scale in the Patient Health Questionnaire (PHQ-9). Both of these measures are psychological tests that ask personal questions of the participant, and have mostly been used to measure the severity of depression. The Beck Depression Inventory is a self-report scale that helps a therapist identify the patterns of depression symptoms and monitor recovery. The responses on this scale can be discussed in therapy to devise interventions for the most distressing symptoms of depression.

== Theories ==
There are multiple schools of depression theory. Beck's cognitive triad theorizes that an individual with depression has "automatic, spontaneous, and seemingly uncontrollable negative thoughts" about the self, the world or environment, and the future. The Tripartite Model of Anxiety and Depression helps to explain the common comorbidity of anxiety and depression by separating symptoms into three groups: negative affect, positive affect, and physiological hyperarousal. The epigenetics of depression is the study of how epigenetics (heritable characteristics that do not involve changes in DNA sequence) contribute to depression. Behavioral theories of depression explain the etiology of depression with behavioral science; adherents promote the use of behavioral therapies for treatment. Evolutionary approaches to depression are attempts by evolutionary psychologists and evolutionary psychiatrists to use the theory of evolution to further understand mood disorders. The biology of depression is the attempt to identify a biochemical origin of depression, as opposed to theories that emphasize psychological or situational causes.

== Management ==
Depressed mood may not require professional treatment, and may be a normal temporary reaction to life events, a symptom of some medical condition, or a side effect of some drugs or medical treatments. A prolonged depressed mood, especially in combination with other symptoms, may lead to a diagnosis of a psychiatric or medical condition which may benefit from treatment.

The UK National Institute for Health and Care Excellence (NICE) 2009 guidelines indicate that antidepressants should not be routinely used for the initial treatment of mild depression, because the risk-benefit ratio is poor.

Physical activity has a protective effect against the emergence of depression in some people. Increased daily step counts have been associated with lower depressive symptoms.

Recent research indicates that mindfulness and mindfulness-based interventions can significantly reduce depression across diverse population groups. Other research suggests that rumination is a significant risk factor for depression, and that reductions in rumination appear to contribute to the beneficial effects of mindfulness meditation on depressive symptoms.

Reminiscence of old and fond memories is another alternative form of treatment, especially for the elderly who have lived longer and have more experiences in life. It is a method that causes a person to recollect memories of their own life, leading to a process of self-recognition and identifying familiar stimuli. By maintaining one's personal past and identity, it is a technique that stimulates people to view their lives in a more objective and balanced way, causing them to pay attention to positive information in their life stories, which would successfully reduce depressive mood levels.

Depression is a common condition among the elderly living in long-term care (LTC) facilities. Although antidepressant medications are frequently prescribed, many residents prefer non-pharmacological treatments such as psychological therapies. A systematic review of 19 randomized controlled trials found that therapies like cognitive behavioural therapy, behavioural therapy, and reminiscence therapy may reduce depressive symptoms and improve short-term quality of life. However, the evidence was of very low certainty, and some participants were more likely to drop out of therapy. There was no clear effect on symptoms, with only short term improvements seen with psychological therapies. Further high-quality studies are needed.

There is limited evidence that continuing antidepressant medication for one year reduces the risk of depression recurrence with no additional harm. Recommendations for psychological treatments or combination treatments in preventing recurrence are not clear. For chronic and treatment-resistant forms of depression, specialized psychotherapies such as cognitive behavioral analysis system of psychotherapy (CBASP) have been developed to address enduring interpersonal patterns that maintain depressive symptoms.

== Epidemiology ==
Depression is the leading cause of disability worldwide, the United Nations (UN) health agency reported, estimating that it affects more than 300 million people worldwide – the majority of them women, young people and the elderly. An estimated 4.4 percent of the global population has depression, according to a report released by the UN World Health Organization (WHO), which shows an 18 percent increase in the number of people living with depression between 2005 and 2015.

Depression is a major mental-health cause of disease burden. Its consequences further lead to significant burden in public health, including a higher risk of dementia, premature mortality arising from physical disorders, and maternal depression impacts on child growth and development. Approximately 76% to 85% of depressed people in low- and middle-income countries do not receive treatment; barriers to treatment include: inaccurate assessment, lack of trained health-care providers, social stigma and lack of resources.

The stigma comes from misguided societal views that people with mental illness are different from everyone else, and they can choose to get better only if they wanted to. Due to this more than half of the people with depression do not receive help with their disorders. The stigma leads to a strong preference for privacy. An analysis of 40,350 undergraduates from 70 institutions by Posselt and Lipson found that undergraduates who perceived their classroom environments as highly competitive had a 37% higher chance of developing depression and a 69% higher chance of developing anxiety. Several studies have suggested that unemployment roughly doubles the risk of developing depression.

The World Health Organization has constructed guidelines – known as The Mental Health Gap Action Programme (mhGAP) – aiming to increase services for people with mental, neurological and substance-use disorders. Depression is listed as one of conditions prioritized by the programme. Trials conducted show possibilities for the implementation of the programme in low-resource primary-care settings dependent on primary-care practitioners and lay health-workers. Examples of mhGAP-endorsed therapies targeting depression include Group Interpersonal Therapy as group treatment for depression and "Thinking Health", which utilizes cognitive behavioral therapy to tackle perinatal depression. Furthermore, effective screening in primary care is crucial for the access of treatments. The mhGAP adopted its approach of improving detection rates of depression by training general practitioners. However, there is still weak evidence supporting this training.

According to 2011 study, people who are high in hypercompetitive traits are also likely to measure higher for depression and anxiety.

== History ==
The term depression was derived from the Latin verb deprimere, "to press down". From the 14th century, "to depress" meant to subjugate or to bring down in spirits. It was used in 1665 in English author Richard Baker's Chronicle to refer to someone having "a great depression of spirit", and by English author Samuel Johnson in a similar sense in 1753.

In Ancient Greece, disease was thought due to an imbalance in the four basic bodily fluids, or humors. Personality types were similarly thought to be determined by the dominant humor in a particular person. Derived from the Ancient Greek melas, "black", and kholé, "bile", melancholia was described as a distinct disease with particular mental and physical symptoms by Hippocrates in his Aphorisms, where he characterized all "fears and despondencies, if they last a long time" as being symptomatic of the ailment.

During the 18th century, the humoral theory of melancholia was increasingly being challenged by mechanical and electrical explanations; references to dark and gloomy states gave way to ideas of slowed circulation and depleted energy. German physician Johann Christian Heinroth, however, argued melancholia was a disturbance of the soul due to moral conflict within the patient.

In the 20th century, the German psychiatrist Emil Kraepelin distinguished manic depression. The influential system put forward by Kraepelin unified nearly all types of mood disorder into manic–depressive insanity. Kraepelin worked from an assumption of underlying brain pathology, but also promoted a distinction between endogenous (internally caused) and exogenous (externally caused) types.

Other psycho-dynamic theories were proposed. Existential and humanistic theories represented a forceful affirmation of individualism. Austrian existential psychiatrist Viktor Frankl connected depression to feelings of futility and meaninglessness. Frankl's logotherapy addressed the filling of an "existential vacuum" associated with such feelings, and may be particularly useful for depressed adolescents.

Researchers theorized that depression was caused by a chemical imbalance in neurotransmitters in the brain, a theory based on observations made in the 1950s of the effects of reserpine and isoniazid in altering monoamine neurotransmitter levels and affecting depressive symptoms. During the 1960s and 70s, manic-depression came to refer to just one type of mood disorder (now most commonly known as bipolar disorder) which was distinguished from (unipolar) depression. The terms unipolar and bipolar had been coined by German psychiatrist Karl Kleist.

In July 2022, a systematic review by British psychiatrist Joanna Moncrieff, researcher Mark Horowitz and others in the academic journal Molecular Psychiatry found that depression is not caused by a serotonin imbalance in the human body. However, the study was met with criticism from some psychiatrists, who argued the study's methodology used an indirect trace of serotonin, instead of taking direct measurements of the molecule. Moncrieff said that no one should "suddenly interrupt [...]" antidepressant treatment.

== See also ==
- Alain Ehrenberg, French sociologist, author of Weariness of the Self: Diagnosing the History of Depression in the Contemporary Age
- Attribution (psychology) – Process by which individuals explain causes of behavior and events
- Biopsychosocial model – Explanatory model emphasizing the interplay among causal forces
- Depression in childhood and adolescence – Pediatric depressive disorders
- Diathesis–stress model – Psychological theory
- Existential crisis – Inner conflict due to perceived meaninglessness
- Feeling – Conscious subjective experience of emotion
- Locus of control – Concept in psychology
- Melancholia – Historical view of extreme depression
- Mixed anxiety–depressive disorder – Diagnostic category in the ICD-10
- Smiling depression – Act of masking depression
- Circadian depression – New type of depression linked to Major depressive disorder
- Dysthymia
- Major depressive disorder
- Depression and Bipolar Support Alliance
