= LHPP =

Protein-coding gene in the species Homo sapiens

An Error has occurred retrieving Wikidata item for infobox

Phospholysine phosphohistidine inorganic pyrophosphate phosphatase is a protein that in humans is encoded by the LHPP gene.
