= Social predictors of depression =

Risk factors in developing an illness

Social predictors of depression are aspects of one's social environment that are related to an individual developing major depression. These risk factors include negative social life events, conflict, and low levels of social support, all of which have been found affect the likelihood of someone experiencing major depression, the length of the depression, or the severity of the symptoms.

== Negative social life events ==
Negative social life events have been found to greatly increase one's risk of depression and clinicians are often quick to check if any major life events have preceded their patient's symptoms. This relationship is largely thought to be causal, with the strongest evidence of causation coming from findings that negative events outside of one's control are strongly associated with depression, making it unlikely that depression symptoms had anything to do with the negative event. Additional support comes from twin studies, which allow for researchers to control for endogenous factors that may be related to its onset. However, noncausal associations are also likely as individuals who are more likely to be depressed may increase their chance of experiencing a negative social event due to placing themselves into relationships where these events may be more common.

Evidence for the association between negative life events and depression comes largely from case studies and studies that compare the frequency of these events in depressed individuals to rates in people who are representative of the larger population. Negative life events are often reported by the depressed, with up to 80% of cases of major depression are preceded by some major life event, and symptoms tend to occur within one month of the event if a diagnosis of major depression is made. This high frequency of negative events is also seen relative to representative samples of the non-depressed population, with studies often showing the depressed to have experienced twice as much of these negative experiences. In addition to this, depressed individuals are more likely to have experienced negative life events preceding their symptoms compared to other mental health issues like schizophrenia and bipolar disorder.

Although negative social experiences are often reported as preceding depression, most people do not get diagnosed with major depression. Part of this stems from the fact that grieving or sadness behavior is often seen as normal and healthy and not worthy of a diagnosis indicating pathology. However, one's history with major depression, levels of social support, gender, sex, and personality differences have all been suggested to play roles in mediating one's sensitivity to pathological depression.

=== Dependent versus independent events ===
The negative life events that lead to depression are often classified as dependent or independent, with dependent events being those an individual has some control over and independent events being those which are mostly due to unavoidable chance.

Dependent events typically involve most stressors that result from interactions with people in addition to variables like performance-based job security and avoidable financial problems. They are more strongly associated with depression than independent events when controlling for severity and may be the result of traits that lead individuals into situations that are more likely to result in depression. In addition to this, they are likely to be more directly related to interpersonal content, at least immediately following when the stressor is felt.

Dependent events are also thought to be more strongly associated with major depression symptoms in people who have a history of it than those experiencing it for the first time. However, the validity of this statement may be dependent on whether one is focusing on relapse or recurrence, with the evidence from recurrent major depression being more supportive.

Although independent events are less associated with depression and social content, they are still positively associated with depression. In addition to this, they have helped contribute evidence for the causal relationship between negative life events and depression, as with dependent events there is always the question of whether depression symptoms played a role in their occurrence.

=== Episodic events and chronic stress ===
Like other types of negative life events, the social experiences that lead to higher probabilities of developing major depression, can either be one-time events or repeated. Episodic events are those with clear beginnings and endings, which usually involve a specific time frame. However, it is often hard to distinguish episodic stressors from chronic stressors as the length of many stressors is expected to vary based on individual, environmental, and cultural factors. However, the loss of a loved one can usually be considered a short-term discrete event, and such instances are estimated to result in depression 17-31% of the time. Other examples of episodic stressors include an unexpected loss of employment, robbery, and assault, all of which are known to increase the likelihood for depression.

In addition to differences in the length of stressful events, researchers have also emphasized that different types of events may relate to differences in how stress is experienced. For example, episodic events like romantic breakups, economic hardship, or assault can result in long periods of chronic stress. This may be due to the likelihood that these events are often caused ongoing problems or the result in them, where a quick fix is often not possible. Although it is less often mentioned in case studies, a lack of social support has also been implicated as a form of chronic stress that increases the likelihood of major depression. Like with the previously mentioned example of romantic breakups, a lack of social support may become a form of chronic stress as it is often something that cannot be fixed quickly and may be a source of conflict.

Both negative life events and chronic stress have each been shown to contribute to the onset of depression, and the two may combine to increase one's risk of depression. For example, acute and chronic stressors were found to increase the likelihood of depression to similar degrees in both men and women in a Spanish sample that compared a depressed group to controls. In addition to their direct effect on depression, both stressors have been suggested to interact, with either chronic stress making individuals more susceptible to the effects of episodic events or by negative life events adding to levels of chronic stress.

=== Sex and gender differences in sensitivity to social loss ===
Major depression is about twice as common in women than in men. One often explored explanation for this is that women experience more negative social events than men; however, there is little evidence for this when looking at the relationship between negative events and depression as a whole. That being said, much variability exists when looking negative event type and risk of depression, particularly if they involve a social component.

In general, women are at much higher risk of developing depression after a social loss than men. One explanation for this is that women tend to have larger networks of meaningful supporters than men where an important loss can happen. Evidence for this comes primarily from the finding that both sexes are equally likely to become depressed in response to conflict or death within the nuclear family, while women are more likely to become depressed in response to the loss of a friend and family members outside of the nuclear family. In addition to this, women may also be more sensitive to depression when conflict exists and is physically expressed as evidenced by women being more likely to be depressed after a physical attack but not men

Another potential explanation is that women experience greater strain than men and have fewer ways to manage or lessen their difficulties. However, there is currently little direct evidence for this.

Although women are typically found to be more sensitive to social loss outside of the nuclear family as a risk factor for depression, supportive social networks have also been shown to be more protective against depression in women. For this reason, Kendler and colleagues suggest that differences in sensitivity to social stressors alone cannot explain the sex difference in depression on its own since the larger social networks of women likely reduce their risk of depression.

== Depression's role in negative life events ==
In addition to negative life events leading to depression, researchers have suggested that depression may also worsen one's social environment, which can further elevate the symptoms of major depression and one's risk of experiencing negative events. This connection between depression and social stressors is best seen through depressed individuals being more likely to experience more negative social events during their depression than non-depressed individuals or those with other conditions. In particular, depressed individuals are more likely to experience social rejection. However, it is unclear what effect increased rejection has on one's experience with depression.

=== Negative feedback and reassurance seeking ===
Of the ways depression might lead to increased social stressors, negative feedback seeking and reassurance seeking are two of the most explored. Both behaviors involve questioning social partners about oneself in ways that are aversive to others, differing in whether the feedback sought is positive or negative

Evidence compatible with reassurance seeking and negative feedback seeking increasing social stress and depression symptoms comes from the frequency of these behaviors among the depressed and the responses of others that often accompany these actions. For example, depressed individuals have been found to engage more in both behaviors than non-depressed individuals and may fail to benefit from positive feedback when it is available.

Reactions to negative feedback and reassurance seeking often include increased likelihood of rejection and contribute to low self-esteem levels, potentially prolonging or increasing both one's depression symptoms and the degree to which the depressed engages in feedback seeking. Therefore, although the negativity of these social impacts may be minor relative to what triggered depression, their effects may be significant once symptoms are present.

In terms of directly connection these behaviors to depression, reassurance seeking style has been reported to be associated with depression symptoms among those experiencing it.

== Conflict ==
In addition to the loss of a relationship with a loved one, conflict has also been suggested as another way social factors can bring about depression. Divorce, separation, and the threat of either often result in both conflict and depression, and serious marital problems and divorce are two of the strongest predictors of depression. Conflict with other family members is also predictive of depression, although not to the extent of marital problems.

Although less studied, conflict outside of the family is also associated with depression. This is seen among the Tsimané, who are more likely to be depressed if they are currently in conflict with anyone, especially if that person is outside of their family.

The relationship between conflict and depression is also seen through assault. This is seen primarily in the short-term, with assault often being the event with the highest likelihood of being correlated with depression after the fact. However, long-term affects are also seen, in that childhood assaults (both sexual and physical) are correlated with greater likelihoods of depression later in life.

== Social support levels ==
Social support levels have a strong inverse relationship with one's risk of becoming depressed despite the challenges that come with measuring them. This effect is most strongly felt in women, who tend to have larger support networks and are more likely to become depressed in response to conflict or loss in relationships outside the nuclear family.

Depressed individuals tend to have lower levels of both perceived and actual support and may express this to others in ways that may exacerbate one's symptoms and put more strain on one's social relationships. Time spent in major depressive episodes is also negatively correlated with social support, but it is unclear whether longer bouts of depression lessen perceived or actual support or if social support helped the depressed return to normal faster.

However, the degree to which the relationship between social support and depression is casual is still uncertain. Questions about causality often come from the possibility that social support levels may be tied to other traits that also play a role in depression. For example, in addition to depression tending to produce negative reactions from others after the fact people with low social support may simply be less interested or less skilled in developing social networks which may help buffer against negative life events. Therefore, a trait that lessons the extent of one's social network may also result in more social adversity or negatively impact one's risk of depression in other, indirect ways.

In addition to low levels of support being a risk factor for depression, high levels are also widely considered to have protective effects. However, these results are not universal and often come from studies limited to self-reports from the depressed.

In today's culture of social networks being tied to social media and with the high numbers of social media users, studies have been conducted recently to determine if there is a relationship between social media use and depression. This topic of research in regard to college students is of significant interest due to the high rates of depression reported in this group. For example, in the American College Health Association's National College Health Assessment for Spring 2019, 46.2% of American undergraduate college students reported feeling "so depressed that it was difficult to function" at any time in the past 12 months. Studies published in the journals Social Science & Medicine in 2017 and Computers in Human Behavior in 2018 have found that problematic or addictive social media use is strongly associated with depression or depressive symptoms. Meanwhile, a study from 2018 in the Journal of Social and Clinical Psychology found that university students who limited time spent on social media for an extended period of time had decreased levels of depression. Another study published in 2018 in the Journal of American College Health found that having close, real-life relationships with social media contacts "was significantly associated with decreased odds of depressive symptoms".

== Depression and the family ==
The family is a potential source of both important social support and conflict, both of which are associated with differences in the likelihood of depression.

=== Risk factors within the family ===
Multiple risk factors for adolescent depression have been identified within the family. Among the strongest is the degree to which conflict is present within a family, with more conflict being associated with greater risk of depression. In addition to this, parental responses to sadness or discontent are also tied to the likelihood of major depression, with both increased aggression and suppressed aggression towards dysphoric children being associated with greater likelihoods of adolescent depression.

Although conflict and social support are often viewed as opposites, it is likely that both are the result of different mechanisms so that high levels of conflict do not necessarily have the same impact as low levels of social support. This is seen in that although low parental support is predictive of depression within the family, high social support from one parent may not be enough to provide protective effects in response to conflict with the other.

=== Familial reactions towards the depressed ===
As with the depressed in general, responses to depressed family members are often aversive. This is seen in that parents of the depressed tend to provide less support and neglect their children more than parents of non-depressed individuals. However, depression has also been found to reduce the chance that a parent will act aggressively towards their child, an outcome that is compatible with evolutionary approaches emphasizing depression's role as a potential signal of need or a bargaining strategy.

== Heritability of social predictors of depression ==
Major depression is estimated to have a moderate heritability of 31-42%, with women having higher estimates than men. One common explanation for why depression risk varies in response to genetic differences is that personality traits, especially neuroticism, lead to differences in how individuals respond to major life events due to mediators like rumination. In other words, certain individuals are likely to have lower thresholds for developing major depression due to how they experience different types of adversity, although even those at low risk of depression may experience depression in response to a negative event.

Another source for the heritability of depression likely comes through the heritability of the social stressors commonly associated with depression. This is true of both independent events and dependent events, with a review by Kendler and Baker (2007) showing heritabilites ranging from 7-39% for many social causes of the adversity associated with depression. When looking at major life events in general, this grows to 20-50% depending on the study and the outcome being examined.

Many examples for of the negative life events often associated with depression being heritable come from within the family and romantic relationships. Within the family, cohesion, organization, expressiveness, activity, control, and conflict are all heritable, with estimates ranging from 18 to 30% depending on the variable. Divorce, which may be particularly likely to result in depression, is moderately heritable with about 35% of differences in one's susceptibility to divorce stemming from genetic differences.

Negative social life events outside of the family are also heritable. This is seen in assault (including rape and mugging), troubles getting along with others in social networks, and job loss all being heritable.

This connection between depression and heritable negative life events has led to the suggestion that part of the heritability of depression stems from greater risk of experiencing environments more likely to lead to its occurrence. However, it is unlikely to be a complete explanation for the heritability of depression, with one estimate being that the heritability of negative life events account 10-15% of the total heritability of depression. Likewise, the effect of genetic polymoprhisms on negative life effents alone is relatively small compared to environmental differences.

== Heritability of protective factors for depression ==
Like risk factors for depression, protective factors have also been shown to be heritable. This is seen in both satisfaction with social relationships and the size of supportive networks, with heritability estimates from 17 to 31% depending on the measure and the population. For example, both family and school connectedness are heritable and unable to be fully accounted for by differences in experience alone. They are also linked to depression, which is negatively correlated with support levels in a longitudinal U.S. sample. This link between depression and a lack of social support and the heritability of aspects of social networks has led to the suggestion that part of depression's heritability likely stems from heritable differences in one's ability to form supportive social networks.

As with predictors of depression, differences in the protective factors associated with social network size and satisfaction may be tied to differences in personality. In particular, differences in one's degree of extraversion are often highlighted as one potential mediator, as extraverts are likely to have larger social networks. In line with this reasoning, extraverts are more likely to experience positive life events, especially those that are dependent on one's behavior. However, it is unclear whether positive life events are protective against depression.

== DSM-5 and the removal of the bereavement exclusion ==
Social factors are also relevant when it comes to diagnosing depression. An exclusion for the diagnosis of depression due to bereavement was originally observed at the back of the DSM-III, noting that because "a full depressive syndrome frequently is a normal reaction to the death of a loved one", the patient's condition was better understood as Uncomplicated Beareavement. This exclusion became part of the diagnostic criteria in the DSM-III-R and DSM-IV, where individuals experiencing depression symptoms were not considered depressed if the symptoms were in response to the death of a loved one and ended within two months. However, this bereavement exclusion was removed under DSM V, allowing a depression diagnosis to be made under these conditions.

Those in favor of this change argue that while grief related to the loss of a loved one and major depression share many overlapping symptoms, they are not the same thing and that, therefore, bereavement should not prevent a depression diagnosis. Although depression could still be diagnosed with the bereavement clause in place if the individual was suicidal, psychotic, or had trouble with day to day tasks, proponents of its removal argue that underdiagnosis of depression was still a risk due to certain severe symptoms not meeting the criteria (e.g., insomnia, rapid weight loss, or trouble concentrating) and the concern that individuals may hide certain symptoms due to fears of being institutionalized.

The major risk of underdiagnosis due to the bereavement clause is that it would prevent individuals from getting the treatment they could receive with a diagnosis. This is exacerbated by the fact that depression is a risk factor for suicide, thereby creating situations where treatment may be lifesaving. For this reason, proponents of the exclusion's removal argue that the judgement of clinicians needs to be unconstrained by whether or not an individual has lost a loved one and that this would be sufficient in preventing its overdiagnosis. A study by Wakefield (2007) compared depression patients whose diagnosis was triggered by death of a loved one and those whose diagnosis was triggered by a different kind of loss. The study found no major symptomatic difference between the two groups, suggesting the death of a loved one should not be treated differently than other losses.

Critics of the change emphasize that the depressive symptoms seen during bereavement are often normal and that the inclusion of the bereavement exclusion was important to prevent overdiagnosis. Like the proponents of removing the exclusion, they emphasize that grieving individuals often experience symptoms used to diagnose major depression; however, they argue that these symptoms can often be resolved without treatment and often fail to become the chronic or recurrent symptoms that should define major depression.

Instead of removing the bereavement exclusion, Wakefield and First (2012) favor the use of provisional qualifiers and the use of patient history to balance the risks of over- and under-diagnosis. They argue that by classifying someone as provisionally normal before the two-month cut-off of the bereavement clause and in the absence of dangers like suicidal behavior, a clinician can avoid the costs of a false-positive diagnosis while still monitoring their patient closely for signs of pathological depression as opposed to normal grief. To avoid the risk of false-negatives, those with a history of major depression could be diagnosed without this provisional tag due to a previous history of depression being a strong predictor for the onset of future episodes.

== See also ==
- Evolutionary approaches to depression
- Major depressive disorder
