= Jon Franklin =

American writer (1942–2024)

Jon Daniel Franklin (January 13, 1942 – January 21, 2024) was an American writer. He was born in Enid, Oklahoma. He won the inaugural Pulitzer Prizes in two journalism categories both for his work as a science writer with the Baltimore Evening Sun. Franklin held a B.S. in journalism from the University of Maryland. He was professor emeritus of journalism at his alma mater; previously, Franklin taught creative writing at the University of Oregon and was the head of the technical journalism department at Oregon State University. He received honorary degrees from the University of Maryland in 1981 and Notre Dame de Namur University in 1982.

The Canadian television film Shocktrauma is based on the book Franklin co-wrote with Alan Doelp.

Working for The Baltimore Sun, Franklin won the first Pulitzer Prize for Feature Writing in 1979, for covering a brain surgery, and won the first Pulitzer Prize for Explanatory Journalism in 1985, for a series about molecular psychiatry, "The Mind Fixers".

Franklin died from esophageal cancer in Annapolis, Maryland, on January 21, 2024. He was 82.

== Books ==
- Shocktrauma (1980) with Alan Doelp
- Not Quite A Miracle (1983) with Alan Doelp
- Guinea Pig Doctors (1984) with Dr. John T. Sutherland; republished in 2003 as If I Die In The Service Of Science: The Dramatic Stories Of Medical Scientists Who Experimented On Themselves
- Writing for Story: Craft Secrets of a Two-Time Pulitzer Prize Winner (1986)
- Franklin, Jon (1987). Molecules of the mind : the brave new science of molecular psychology. New York: Dell Pub. ISBN 0-440-50005-2. OCLC 17958586.
- The Wolf In The Parlor: The Eternal Connection between Humans and Dogs (2009)
