= The Mind Fixers =

News story series about psychiatry

The Mind Fixers was a seven-part series of newspaper stories by Jon Franklin which won the award for Pulitzer Prize for Explanatory Journalism in 1985, first appearing in the Baltimore Evening Sun in July 1984.

The series explores the science of molecular psychiatry as an alternative to psychoanalysis since Freud, dismissing the latter as "surrounded by an aura of witchcraft, proceeding on impression and hunch, often ineffective, it was the bumbling and sometimes humorous stepchild of modern science."

Based upon interviews with more than fifty scientists, Franklin takes a generally optimistic point of view, looking forward to the possibility of "psychic engineering" when psychiatry becomes an "exact science" with "specialized drugs". He paraphrases his sources as saying that the new science is "capable of curing the mental diseases that afflict perhaps 20 percent of the population and constitute a major drain on the gross national product," as well as "untangling the ancient enigma of criminality and violence, and eventually expanding the boundaries of "the normal mind."

== Academic and Medical Sources ==
Philosopher Daniel Dennett says "we're out an out materialists", summing up opinions of academics at a Johns Hopkins conference who find that mind is a direct mechanistic outgrowth of the brain. Dr. Candace Pert of NIMH says that the mechanistic view is the humanitarian one, arguing for destigmatization giving that mental illness is purely physical illness.
