= Network neuroscience =

Approach to understanding the human brain

Network neuroscience is an approach to understanding the structure and function of the human brain through an approach of network science, through the paradigm of graph theory. A network is a connection of many brain regions that interact with each other to give rise to a particular function. Network Neuroscience is a broad field that studies the brain in an integrative way by recording, analyzing, and mapping the brain in various ways. The field studies the brain at multiple scales of analysis to ultimately explain brain systems, behavior, and dysfunction of behavior in psychiatric and neurological diseases. Network neuroscience provides an important theoretical base for understanding neurobiological systems at multiple scales of analysis.

== Multiple scales of analysis for the brain ==
=== Microscale ===
On the microscale (nanometer to micrometer), network analysis is performed on individual neurons and synapses. Due to the incredible number of neurons in a brain network, it is extremely difficult to construct a complete network at the microscale. Specifically, data collection is too slow to resolve all of the billions of neurons, machine vision tools to annotate the collected data are insufficient, and we lack the mathematical algorithms to properly analyze the resulting networks. Mapping the brain at the cellular level in vertebrates currently requires post-mortem (after death) microscopic analysis of limited portions of brain tissue. Non-optical techniques that rely on high-throughput DNA sequencing have been proposed recently by Anthony Zador (CSHL).

=== Mesoscale ===
On the mesoscopic scale (micrometer to millimeter), mesoscale analysis seeks to capture anatomically distinct populations of typically 80-120 neurons (e.g. cortical columns) across different brain regions. Mesoscale analysis allows integration of both microscale and macroscale studies, and thus allows multiscale and structural-functional integration. This scale still presents a very ambitious technical challenge at this time and can only be probed on a small scale with invasive techniques or very high field magnetic resonance imaging (MRI) on a local scale.

=== Macroscale ===
On the macroscale (millimeter), large brain areas can be analyzed for anatomical distinctions, their structure and interactions. The macroscopic scale is best suited for mapping and annotating human connectomes, a comprehensive map of neural connections, with cognitive and behavioral associations since in vivo imaging of the human connectome is only available at the macroscale. Additionally, macroscale analysis permits more compact and comprehensive mapping. Magnetic resonance imaging, functional magnetic resonance imaging (fMRI), and diffusion-weighted magnetic resonance imaging (DW-MRI) are the most popular tools for building macroscale data sets due to their availability and resolution, among fMRI's and dMRI's abilities to parce structural and functional connectivities, respectively.

== Mapping brain networks ==
Brain networks can be mapped at multiple scales using both structural connectivity and functional connectivity imaging techniques. Structural descriptions of the components of neuronal networks are described as the connectome.

=== Structural connectivity ===
Structural connectivity describes how regions in the brain can communicate through anatomical pathways such as synaptic coupling between cells and axonal projections between neurons at the micro-scale and meso-scale and white matter fiber bundles at the macro scale. Diffusion-weighted MRI data is used to measure white-matter bundles.

=== Functional connectivity ===
Functional connectivity measures the commonality in function between anatomically separated brain regions and is usually measured at the macroscopic level. This commonality of function is inferred from similar activation patterns in imaging techniques such as functional magnetic resonance imaging (fMRI). Many of these fMRI experiments are known as resting-state experiments and measure spontaneous brain activity when the participant is told to relax. Similar (Blood-Oxygen Level Dependent) BOLD signals between different regions represent co-activation between these regions. There are many new methods that have emerged for extracting functional connectivity from fMRI data including Granger causality and dynamic causal modeling (DCM).

Even though fMRI is the preferred method for measuring large-scale functional networks, electroencephalography (EEG) has also shown some progress in measuring resting state functional brain networks. In a simultaneous fMRI-EEG study, a statistically significant correlation was observed between the fMRI data and the EEG data thus showing that EEG can be a new and promising method to measure functional brain networks. The advantage of using EEG over fMRI includes its large temporal resolution.

There are novel methods to study functional connectivity. Polarized Light Imaging (PLI) allows high-resolution quantitative analysis of fiber orientations and can be used to bridge the microscopic and macroscopic levels of analysis. Optogenetic functional MRI (ofMRI) allows selective mapping of brain regions based on genetic markers, anatomic location, and axonal projections. Optogenetics can connect cellular activity with BOLD fMRI signals.

Functional networks differ from structural networks in that they have additional properties not evident by studying the structural network alone. There are new methods using linear algebra such as the eignenmode approach that seek to explain the complicated connection between functional and structural networks.

== Analyzing brain networks ==
=== Graph theory ===
The utilization of graph theory in neuroscience studies has been actively applied after the discovery of functional brain networks. In graph theory, an N × N adjacency matrix (also called a connection matrix) with the elements of zero or non-zero indicates the absence or presence of a relationship between the vertices of a network with N nodes. By analyzing different metrics from these connection matrices from the network, one can obtain a topological analysis of the desired graph; and this is referred to as the human brain network in the field of neuroscience.

One of the core architectures in brain network models is the "small-world" architecture. It interprets models to be regular networks, while they occasionally experience random activity. In small-world networks, the clustering coefficient (i.e., transitivity) is high, and the average path distance is short. These two characteristics reflect the central maxim in the natural biological process: the balance between minimizing the resource cost and maximizing the flow of information among the network components. Given the complex structure of the human brain, measures that can represent the small-world properties of the brain network are of great importance since it simplifies the systems and becomes decipherable.

Graph theoretical approaches have set up a mathematical framework to model the pairwise communications between elements of a network. In human neuroscience, graph theory is generally applied to either functional or effective connectivity. Graph theory methods, when applied properly, can offer important new insights into the structure and function of networked brain systems, including their architecture, evolution, development, and clinical disorders. It describes meaningful information about the topological architecture of human brain networks, such as small-worldness, modular organization, and highly connected or centralized hubs. For example, in a study hypothesizing that aging processes modulate brain connectivity networks, 170 healthy elderly volunteers were submitted to EEG recordings in order to define age-related normative limits. Graph theory functions were applied to exact low-resolution electromagnetic tomography on cortical sources in order to evaluate the small-world parameter as a representative model of network architecture. It is based on the strength of synchronization in the time-varying oscillatory electromagnetic activity of different brain regions as measured by EEG or MEG.

=== Key components of network analysis ===
Key components include:

==== Node degree, distribution and assortativity ====
The degree of a node is the number of connections that link with the rest of the network, which is one of the fundamental measures for defining the model. The degrees of all the network's nodes form a degree distribution. In random networks, all connections are equally probable, resulting in a Gaussian and symmetrically centered degree distribution. Complex networks generally have non-Gaussian degree distributions. By convention, the degree distributions of scale-free networks follow a power law. Lastly, assortativity is the correlation between the degrees of connected nodes. Positive assortativity indicates that high-degree nodes tend to connect to each other.

==== Clustering coefficients and motifs ====
The clustering coefficient is a measure of the degree to which each node in a graph tends to cluster together. Random networks have low average clustering whereas complex networks have high clustering (associated with high local efficiency of information transfer and robustness). Interactions between neighboring nodes can also be quantified by counting the occurrence of small motifs of interconnected nodes. The distribution of different motifs in a network provides information about the types of local interactions that the network can support.

===== Path length and efficiency =====
Path length is the minimum number of edges that must be traversed between two nodes. Random and complex networks have short mean path lengths (high global efficiency of parallel information transfer) whereas regular lattices have long mean path lengths. Efficiency is the inversely related metric related to the path length. It is more actively utilized than the path length due to its easier numerical use and interpretation - for instance, estimating topological distances between elements of disconnected graphs.

===== Connection density or cost =====
Connection density is the actual number of edges in the graph as a proportion of the total number of possible edges. It is the simplest estimator of the physical cost of a network — for example, the energy or other resource requirements.

===== Hubs, centrality, and robustness =====
Hubs are nodes with high degree, or high centrality. The centrality of a node measures how many of the shortest paths between all other node pairs in the network pass through it. A node with high centrality is thus crucial to efficient communication. The importance of an individual node to network efficiency can be evaluated by deleting (i.e., lesioning) the certain hubs and estimating the efficiency of that 'lesioned' network. Robustness refers either to the structural integrity of the network following deletion of nodes or edges or to the effects of perturbations on local or global network states.

===== Modularity =====
Many complex networks consist of a number of modules. There are various algorithms that estimate the modularity of a network, and one of the widely utilized algorithms is based on hierarchical clustering. Each module contains several densely interconnected nodes, and there are relatively few connections between nodes in different modules. Hubs can therefore be described in terms of their roles in this community structure. Provincial hubs are connected mainly to nodes in their own modules, whereas connector hubs are connected to nodes in other modules.

===== Energy =====
Network energy, derived from structural balance theory, quantifies the stability of functional brain networks. A network with lower energy reflects a stable and well-coordinated configuration that optimizes neural efficiency. Conversely, an increased energy level, characterized by more flexible configurations, signifies network instability, allowing for dynamic reorganization of connections. This concept has been explored in cognitive control tasks, where sensory networks exhibit elevated energy to enhance flexibility for processing stimuli, while cognitive networks operate efficiently with relatively lower energy requirements. By integrating network energy as a global measure, predictive modeling improves, demonstrating its potential as a biomarker for neurological and mental health conditions.

=== Models ===
==== Dynamic networks ====
Brain networks are not immutable, static constructs; rather those networks are highly variable based on multiple time scales. Data on time-varying brain graphs generally takes the form of time series (or stacks) of graphs that form an ordered series of snapshots, for example data recorded in the course of learning or across developmental stages. This dynamicity can be represented through tracking the changes in network topology utilizing the graph measures on each time point.

==== Multilayer networks ====
The arrival of multi-omic data has enabled the joint analysis of networks between elements of neurobiological systems at different levels of organization. Prime examples are recent studies that combine maps of anatomical and functional networks, as well as studies that combine large-scale brain connectivity data with spatially registered data on patterns of gene expression.

==== Algebraic topology ====
Network science is largely built on the tools of graph theory, which focuses on the dyad (a single connection between two nodes) as the fundamental unit of interest. However, recent evidence suggests that sensor networks, technological networks, and even neural networks display higher-order interactions that simply cannot be reduced to pairwise relationships. To address this, network science started to incorporate algebraic topology. Algebraic topology reframes the problem of relational data in terms of simplices or collections of vertices, rather than pairs. IN other words, simplices represent the relational data in terms of collections of vertices: a 0-simplex is a node, a 1-simplex is an edge, and a 2-simplex is a filled (connected) triangle. Due to the macroscopic scale to re-define the network systems through "simplicies", topological data analysis can detect, quantify and compare mesoscale structure present in complex network data.

==== Network of networks ====
Analyzing similarity between brain networks - also referred to as the network of network - can be useful for several applications in cognitive and clinical neuroscience. In cognitive neuroscience experiments, similarity analysis of brain networks can be used to build a "semantic map": nodes represent the estimated networks of visual/auditory objects, and edges denote the similarity between these networks. In clinical neuroscience, a potential application of network distance measures is the mapping of a "disease network". Here, the nodes may represent each brain disease and the edges can represent the similarity between the different networks associated with each disease - for example, Parkinson's, Alzheimer's, and epilepsy. Another potential application of the network of networks approach is to construct a similarity network across species connectomes, in which nodes can denote species and edges the similarity between them. However, the major difficulty of this cross-species network analysis is devising the measure to access the different connectome data from a range of species as each specimen has a unique biological baseline or structure. Yet, this may help to better understand cross-species communalities and differences in terms of brain structure and function.

== Large-scale brain networks ==
When Blood-Oxygen-Level-Dependent (BOLD) signal activity in different areas of our brains co-occur, during tasks or rest, those areas are considered to have varying degrees of functional connectivity between them. Large Scale Brain Networks occur when various different areas in the brain are showing co-activation and functional connectivity with each other, either during rest or when a certain task is performed. Current large scale brain networks include the Default Mode Network, the Salience Network, the FrontoParietal Network, the Attention Network, the Sensorimotor Network, the Visual Network and the Cingulo-Opercular Network.

=== Default mode ===
The Default Mode Network (DMN) is a large-scale brain network that is active while the brain is at wakeful rest. It was initially noticed to be deactivated during external goal oriented tasks, specifically tasks involving visual attention or cognitive working memory. Because of this, it was referred to as a task-negative network. However, when tasks are internally goal-oriented, the default mode network is activated and positively correlated with other brain networks. Similarly, this network has also been shown to be active when individuals are focused on their internal mental-state processes. Internal mental-state processes can include daydreaming, thinking of the future, remembering memories, thinking of others and ourselves, mind wandering and introspection.

Some of the main anatomical features of this network include the medial prefrontal cortex, posterior cingulate cortex and areas of the inferior parietal lobule, such as the angular gyrus. Abnormalities in the DMN have been associated with Autism Spectrum Disorders, Alzheimer's and Schizophrenia.

=== Salience ===
The Salience Network is thought to be made up of primarily the anterior insula and the anterior cingulate cortex. This network functions not only to complete bottom-up recognition of salient stimuli, such as sensory and emotional occurrences, but also aids in switching between various other large scale brain networks such as the Default Mode Network and the Frontal-Parietal Network. In this way, the Salience Network allows us to generate and perform the correct behavioral response to a given salient stimuli. The salience network also integrates the ventral attention network in its function to respond to unexpected salient behavioral stimuli. Salience Network dysfunction has been associated with schizophrenia, anxiety disorders, and Autism Spectrum Disorders.

=== Attention ===
During tasks that require attention, certain regions become more active while others become less active. This is because there are different networks in the brain that are responsible for different types of activity and are activated by different types of stimuli. There are two main systems that modulate different aspects of attention: the dorsal frontoparietal system and the ventral frontoparietal system.

The Dorsal frontoparietal system primarily functions in goal-oriented control over visuospatial attention. This network increases activity with attention-demanding tasks; it guides "top-down voluntary allocation of attention to locations or features." It is composed primarily of the intraparietal sulcus (IPS) and the frontal eye fields (FEF). Researchers have used tools such as fMRI and MRI to locate these regions by monitoring the brain while people perform various cognitive tasks. The Ventral frontoparietal system, on the other hand, is responsible for triggering shifts of attentions. The system is implicated in detecting unexpected stimuli and guiding where attention should be directed.

While there are two relatively distinct systems involved in attention, they must interact in a dynamic way to give rise to flexible and fluid attention. The way they interact is thought to be determined by the type of task that is at hand.

=== Frontoparietal ===
The frontoparietal network, also known as the Central Executive Network, is one of the large-scale brain networks involved in manipulating and maintaining information in working memory. It also plays a role in decision making and problem solving regarding goal-directed behavior. The major anatomical parts of this network are the dorsolateral prefrontal cortex and the posterior parietal cortex. Brain imaging research has shown this network becomes more active during cognitively demanding tasks, unlike other networks such as the Default Mode Network, which reduces activity during cognitive tasks. Despite the distinct network systems in terms of cognitive tasks, these two networks are theorised to interact via the Salience Network. The Salience Network, which is involved in bottom-up processing, modulates between the Default Mode Network and the Frontoparietal Network.

=== Sensorimotor ===
The sensorimotor, or somatomotor, network is a large-scale brain network that is activated during motor tasks. It includes the somatosensory and motor regions and extends to the supplementary motor areas and auditory cortex. Sensorimotor performance declines with age. This may be due to age-related reduction in GABA levels, leading to less segregated networks that then affects sensorimotor performance.

=== Visual ===
The visual network's function is to receive, integrate, and process visual information relayed from the retinas. The visual cortex, located in the occipital lobe, handles this process. It is divided into five different areas, V1-V5, each with different functions and structures. V1 processes simple visual components such as orientation and direction. V2 received the information from V1 and further interpreted that data through differences in color, spatial frequency, moderately complex patterns, and object orientation before sending feedback connections to V1 and feedforward connections with V3-V5. Regions like the occipital and lingual gyri are stable for visual feature binding in the visual system network. The parietal lobe is also identified as crucial for the binding process of color and shape features and the fusiform and inferior temporal gyri for processing color and shape information. The further the information travels, the more specialized cells there are to receive and interpret the data.

=== Cingulo-opercular ===
The cingulo-opercular (CO) network fundamentally functions to maintain tonic alertness which is the effortful process of making cognitive faculties available for processing requirements. The network is composed of the anterior insula/operculum, dorsal anterior cingulate cortex, and thalamus. The CO network is frequently co-activated with other control-related networks such as the frontoparietal (FP) network. Both play a role in executive functions but are also vulnerable to decline in non-pathological aging. At rest in older adults, average CO connectivity is associated with better working memory, inhibition, and set-shifting performance whereas FP connectivity is associated with only working memory.

== Newer Theories ==
=== Artificial Neural Networks ===
Neural networks (i.e., artificial neural networks (ANNs) or simulated neural networks (SNNs)), are a subset of machine learning and are widely used as deep learning algorithms. Gleaned from the terminology itself, the name and structure of the models are inspired by the mechanism of human brain, which simulates the way that neurons signal to one another. Three major types of ANNs are (1) feedforward neural networks (i.e., Multi-Layer Perceptrons (MLPs)), (2) convolutional neural networks (CNNs), and (3) recurrent neural networks (RNNs).

=== Overlapping Networks ===
Recently, it has come to light that the same brain regions can be part of multiple networks and networks can have significant overlap between them. The most common methods for measuring brain networks are "winner-takes-all" approaches where each region is only assigned to one network. However, the organization of the brain makes it unlikely that the networks are actually nonoverlapping. One study used novel methods such as Latent Dirichlet Association (LDA) combined with Independent Components Analysis (ICA) to generate multiple overlapping networks. These networks were consistent with the nonoverlapping networks previously generated. Another study showed that overlapping networks occur in high frequency throughout the cerebral cortex. The Default Mode Network (DMN) and the subjective value network (SVN) both share regions in the central ventromedial prefrontal cortex (cVMPFC) and dorsal posterior cingulate cortex (dPCC).

== Emotion ==
=== Affective neuroscience theory ===
Affective neuroscience (AN) theory aims to understand the material basis of emotions and examines how the brain constructs emotional responses. It postulates that seven primary emotional controls encompass the human emotional experience. These seven systems include: seeking, lust, care, play, fear, anger/rage, and panic/sadness. Thorough studies of these systems have been performed in animals, yet this data must be translated to human applications. Applications of tools from network neuroscience and psychometry are used to map and correlate connectivity patterns between the seven circuits.

=== Constructed emotion ===
The theory of constructed emotion (TCE) offers an explanation of the basis of emotion by formulating the brain as a running internal model that controls central pattern generators in order to maintain allostasis. This theory argues that the computational goal of the brain is to minimize the prediction error, unpredicted events, that arise in a particular sensory environment. Once prediction error is minimized, the brain's predictions become experiences and perceptions and the brain categorizes sensory events. In this manner, the brain continually updates and constructs its categorizations and predictions. When the brain's internal model constructs an emotion concept, the subsequent categorization elicits an emotion. It is hypothesized that the brain's default mode network is necessary to the generation its internal model while the salience network tunes the internal model by minimizing prediction error.

=== Emotions as functionally integrated systems ===
Emotional representation in the brain has been proposed to be a functionally integrated system that involve large-scale cortical-subcortical networks tuned by bodily signals. A functionally integrated emotional system is consistent with analysis of fMRI data indicating emotional states are highly distributed and predicts that brain "signatures" of affective dimensions, such as arousal and fear, strongly depend on the sensory and contextual environment, which may not generalize well across environments and tasks. This model also explains why structures, such as the amygdala, are so important to emotions, as they are important hubs of distributed cortical-subcortical functionally integrated systems.

== Cognitive function ==
=== Theories ===
Cognitive function is a term that encompasses mental processes involved in the acquisition of knowledge, manipulation of information, and reasoning. The typical domains categorized as cognitive function are perception (including sensory perception), memory, learning, attention, decision making, and language abilities.

One of the objectives in cognitive science is to reduce cognitive systems to models of representations paired with processes. In cognitive neuroscience, brain structures composed of complex organizations of neurons are assumed to support cognitive functions; and thus, the field actively utilizes neural localization techniques (such as neuroimaging) to describe and identify the cognitive processes in the brain. The variables in neural localization protocols are used to predict behavioral indices to make inferences about the operations of the underlying neural substrate. In contrast to these traditional approaches, cognitive network neuroscience focuses on complex interactions between spatially discrete brain regions, represented by graphs, and seeks to link these patterns of interaction to measured behavioral variables. The key consequence of using network representations is that they can describe and uncover higher-level complexity in terms of the interaction perspective and further identify the overall processes of neural-behavioral activity.

=== Applications ===
==== Sensory perception and learning ====
With respect to sensory perception, network studies have shown that the strengthening of key functional connections underlies tasks that demand sensory integration. For instance, the spatial distribution of network modules in auditory and visual cortex and of hub-like areas became more constrained to traditional anatomical boundaries in a multisensory task and displayed less variability across subjects. Network approaches can therefore contextualize the local functions of primary sensory areas within systems that support dynamic sensory integration and consolidation. Such approaches suggest that tasks with a heavy emphasis on sensory processing and integration appear to depend on tightly communicating cognitive hubs and sensorimotor regions.

Recent studies in learning have begun to capture dynamic patterns of functional connectivity at finer temporal scales, from temporal networks extracted from contiguous 2–3 min windows of fMRI experiments to long-term scale experiments. Using these fMRI data, dynamic community detection techniques can uncover changes in clusters of brain regions linked by strong functional connectivity (i.e., putative functional modules). One possible interpretation of the dynamicity of fMRI data obtained from learning experiments is based on the flexibility of brain network dynamics. Brain network dynamics is commonly defined as the frequencies of a brain region when it changes its allegiances to network modules over time. his provides an index to individual differences in learning: more flexible individuals learn better than less flexible individuals.

==== Human intelligence ====
===== Spearman's enigmatic g =====
Research in the psychological and brain sciences has long sought to understand the nature of individual differences in human intelligence, examining the stunning breadth and diversity of intellectual abilities and the remarkable cognitive and neurobiological mechanisms from which they emerge. These early findings motivated Spearman's two-factor model which held that performance on tests of mental ability jointly reflect (i) a specific factor, s, that is unique to each test, and (ii) a general factor, g, that is common across all tests. Contemporary research has further elaborated Spearman's model to include an intermediate level of broad abilities that account for the variance that is shared across similar domains of cognitive ability. elucidate how g – reflected in the positive manifold and the hierarchical pattern of correlations among tests – emerges from individual differences in the network topology and dynamics of the human brain.

===== Intelligence models =====
Spearman's model of general intelligence has been elaborated in modern theories to include an intermediate level of cognitive domains that are broader than specific abilities 's', but are less comprehensive than g. These intermediate level abilities include (i) crystallized intelligence, which underlies performance on tests of previously acquired knowledge, and (ii) fluid intelligence, which reflects the capacity for adaptive reasoning in novel environments. From a network neuroscience perspective, the formation of broad abilities reflects the competing forces of local versus global efficiency. Such competing forces in terms of efficiency conclude the existence of modules that create a broader set of cognitive abilities whose topology enables a more globally efficient, small-world network.

Network neuroscience further adopts a new perspective, proposing that g originates from individual differences in the system-wide topology and dynamics of the human brain. In this viewpoint, the small-world topology of brain networks enables the rapid reconfiguration of their modular community structure, creating globally coordinated mental representations of a desired goal-state and the sequence of operations required to achieve it. The capacity to flexibly transition between network states therefore provides the foundation for individual differences in g which consists of two states: (i) easy-to-reach network states to construct mental representations for crystallized intelligence based on prior knowledge and experience, and (ii) difficult-to-reach network states to construct mental representations for fluid intelligence based on cognitive control functions that guide adaptive reasoning and problem-solving. Thus, network flexibility and dynamics provide the foundation for general intelligence – enabling rapid information exchange across networks and capturing individual differences in information processing at a global level.

===== Theories on personality =====
Personality is the characteristic patterns of thinking, feeling, and behaving. Its psychological foundation lies in the observation that individual differences follow principles–traits or dispositions–that are sufficiently stable within individuals, consistent between individuals, and invariant to situational context to explain past and to predict future behavior.

In science, personality traits are often investigated using the five-factor-model, a set of personality factors that are empirically defined and stable over time. They are useful in explaining specific types of behavior. The five-factor-model includes neuroticism, extraversion, openness/intellect, agreeableness and conscientiousness. Previous studies have identified the connection between personality factors and certain structures, functional brain networks and regions and how these interactions are crucial to emotional and cognitive processes.

Individuals are classified along the trait continuum and with traits producing consistent behaviors across situations and times, a person scoring at the upper end of a trait will respond consistently stronger to relevant stimuli as opposed to a person scoring at the lower end. Because each situation is associated with a certain brain state (functional connectivity, network state), such states bear trait-like connectivity across situations and times as well, representing the neural trait system. This correlates to the trait theory that personality traits are biophysical entities that actually exist in the brain as conceptual nervous systems.

From the concept of personality and network neuroscience sprouts the field of personality network neuroscience (PNN). The goal of personality network neuroscience is to identify and to integrate neural systems (or biophysical entities) associated with psychological trait conceptions within an integrated framework for human personality. It promises an integrative, network level account of brain-personality relationships. PNN utilizes techniques from affective and cognitive neuroscience to relate brain processes to personality characteristics. MRI is the backbone technology of this field. It is a medical technology that has enabled researchers to non-invasively assess neural processes in the awake human brain and has allowed for the discovery of marvelous insights into the neural foundation of psychological processes.

One study on personality and network neuroscience selected regions-of-interest based on their inclusion within the default mode network (DMN), the salience network (SN), the cognitive executive network (CEN), or on their strong relation with these networks to investigate the relationship between personality domains and brain activity. Personality profiles were generated from the NEO Five-Factor Inventory that contains 60 questions related to five different personality domains (personality factors): neuroticism, extraversion, openness/intellect, agreeableness and conscientiousness. The results from this test showed that there were strong and significant correlations between several of the domains: neuroticism was negatively correlated to agreeableness, extraversion and conscientiousness; agreeableness was positively correlated to openness, extraversion and conscientiousness; extraversion was positively correlated to conscientiousness. The study concluded that personality profiles allow for personality factors to be observed in the context of all other traits and two of them were found to be associated with patterns of co-activation in the brain during rest in regions involved with emotion and cognition. These findings could be proved useful in linking personality to increased risk for psychiatric disorders and better understanding of normal and pathological processes.

== Psychiatric Disorders ==
=== Autism spectrum disorder ===
Autism spectrum disorder (ASD) is a neuro developmental disorder, most commonly diagnosed in childhood, and is characterized by deficits in social and communication skills. Symptoms include social impairments, hyper-fixations, repetitive behaviors and hypersensitivity. ASD severity falls on a spectrum, which means some individuals may have very severe symptoms and social impairments and might need substantial assistance, while others require less support. ASD individuals have been shown to have abnormal reduced intrinsic functional connectivity in their Default Mode Network (DMN) as well as disruptions in their Frontoparietal Network (FPN or CEN) and Salience Network (SN). Most notably for the SN, ASD patients have been shown to have hypoactivity in the anterior insula, one of the anchoring points of the SN in the brain. It is thought that these disruptions within networks result in disrupted interactions between networks, resulting in the ASD pathology. More specifically, the reduced activity in the SN leads to deficient signaling to the FPN and the DMN, leading to a "disengagement of cognitive systems important for attending to salient external stimuli or internal mental events.".

=== Schizophrenia ===
Schizophrenia is a psychiatric disorder that is most commonly diagnosed in adulthood. It is usually characterized by psychotic symptoms, such as hallucinations and delusions, disorganized speech and motor behavior, deficits in attention, concentration and memory, as well as negative symptoms, such as social isolation, loss of motivation and enjoyment in previous fulfilling activities and loss of emotional expression. Primary networks implicated in Schizophrenia include the Frontoparietal Network (FPN), Default mode Network (DMN) and the Salience Network (SN). In one study participants with schizophrenia showed significant deficits in functional connectivity in the FPN when compared to healthy controls. Schizophrenia patients have shown hyperconnectivity as well as hypoconnectivity in the DMN. One study found that schizophrenia patients had hyperconnectivity from the Posterior Cingulate Cortex (PCC) to the Medial PreFrontal Cortex (mPFC), when compared to healthy controls. Other studies have shown hypoconnectivity and reduced anatomical connectivity in the DMN, with mPFC dysfunction playing a leading role. These connection deficits in the DMN can be associated with the positive symptoms experienced in schizophrenia such as hallucinations and delusions. There are also functional and structural abnormalities in the Salience Network in individuals with schizophrenia. Structurally, main nodes of the SN such as the anterior insula and Anterior Cingulate Cortex (ACC) have been shown to have a bilateral volume reduction when compared to healthy controls; and this reduced volume has been correlated with the severity of reality distortion experienced by schizophrenic patients. Studies have also shown that increased activation in the anterior insula and the frontal operculum in the SN is correlated with experiences of auditory verbal hallucinations in schizophrenic patients. Similar to ASD, it is thought that these disruptions within networks result in disrupted interactions between networks, such as reduced functional connectivity between the SN and the DMN which results in the schizophrenia pathology.

=== Addiction ===
Addiction is a complicated disorder and one that can strongly be influenced by environmental, societal and genetic factors and there are many risk factors that put certain people at a greater likelihood of developing an addiction. There are two types of addiction to be considered: substance use disorder (SUD), usually characterized by uncontrolled drug seeking and taking, and behavioral addictions (BA), characterized by a compulsion or need to perform certain behaviors or practices, such as gambling. The compulsion that accompanies the action, either performing the behavior or taking the drug, as well as negative emotions if not allowed to complete compulsion and lack of self control are all indicators of both disorders. The networks most associated with addiction are the Frontoparietal Network, the Reward Network, the Salience Network and the Memory and Habit networks. In individuals with addiction, there seems to be a general theme of hyper-activation of these networks when exposed to drug cues. During resting state, it appears that in chronic stimulant users there is a tight coupling and connection between the Reward, Salience, Memory and Habit networks, and these networks all have enhanced connection with the Frontoparietal Network.

=== Bipolar disorder ===
Bipolar disorder (BD) is a mood disorder usually characterized by extreme mood swings and oscillating periods of intense emotion, such as mania and depression. The cycling between manic and depressive episodes is the main hallmark of bipolar disorder. In BD, there seems to be a disconnect between the Frontoparietal Network (FPN) and Default Mode Network (DMN), in which the FPN is unable "to suppress task irrelevant DMN activity during cognitive performance" which leads to BD's cognitive impairments. It also appears that in BD, there is a disruption in the recruitment of the salience network which contributes to cognitive dysregulation. Bipolar disorder is also thought to be characterized by abnormal functional connectivity between the FPN and motivational networks, with the DMN playing a mediation role. All these aberrant connectivity and dysregulation leads to the BD pathology witnessed in patients with this mood disorder.

=== Anxiety disorders ===
Anxiety disorders is a category of various mental disorders characterized by uncontrollable fear and anxiety. The most common of these is generalized anxiety disorder. Studies show many different brain regions and networks implicated in this group of disorders, as well as similar differences seen across disorders. For example, dysfunction in the central executive network is implicated in most major psychiatric disorders, including depression and anxiety. Abnormalities regarding the functional connectivity of the default mode network have also been identified in most major psychiatric disorders.

More specifically related to anxiety, studies show that they are associated with hyperactivity in the cingulo-opercular and central attention networks. There is also decreased activity within the fronto-parietal and default mode networks in those with anxiety. Within the Salience Network, hyperactivity in the anterior insula has been linked to anxiety disorders and negative thoughts.

=== Post-traumatic stress disorder ===
Post-traumatic stress disorder (PTSD) is a mental disorder triggered by a specific event that causes flashbacks, nightmares, and severe anxiety. Similar to other psychiatric disorders, there are multiple brain networks implicated in this disorder. Studies have shown that the Central Executive Network has decreased connectivity during cognitive tasks in those with PTSD compared to controls. Examples of these types of tasks include emotional processing or working memory tasks. There is also decreased connectivity within the Salience Network in the brains of people who suffer from PTSD. The Default Mode Network, on the other hand, shows higher connectivity. In a healthy brain, the Salience Network modulates between the activation of the Central Executive Network and the Default Mode Network. The alternating network systems functioned by the anterior insula is not done as effectively in those with PTSD, which could account for the differences in activation.

=== Depression ===
Depression, or major depressive disorder, is a mood disorder characterized by persistent feelings of sadness. It affects the way one thinks, feels, and acts. The Central Executive Network, which helps maintain information in working memory and aids in decision making and problem solving, has been shown to be hypoactive in individuals with depression. Hyperconnectivity between the Central Executive Network and areas of the Default Mode Network has also been observed. Within the Default Mode Network, depressed individuals exhibit hyperconnectivity. This network is believed to be involved in internally oriented thought.

=== Psychopathy ===
Psychopathy is a personality disorder that is characterized by antisocial behavior, lack of remorse and empathy, and impaired decision making. Studies that examine the neural correlates of this disorder find similar dysfunction across the large-scale brain networks that can be seen in other psychiatric disorders such as depression and anxiety. These studies discovered functional differences within the Default Mode Network (DMN) and the Central Executive Network (CEN), as well as across networks. Many individuals exhibit hyperactivity in the Default Mode Network, as well as decreased activity in the Dorsal Anterior Cingulate Cortex (dorsal ACC). The Dorsal ACC is one of the major nodes of the Salience Network, which is the network that is supposed to modulate between the DMN and the CEN. This decreased activation is hypothesized to be one of the reasons for the increased activation in the DMN due to the lack of alternating activation patterns from DMN to the Salience Network. One study done with a group of incarcerated individuals with psychopathy also showed that higher levels of psychopathy were linked to a more efficient organisation within the dorsal attention network.

== Neurological disorders ==
=== ALS ===
Amyotrophic Lateral Sclerosis (ALS) is a neurodegenerative disease of upper and lower motor neurons, leading to respiratory issues and death in 3–5 years. Multiple networks can be impacted in ALS showing that it is a multisystem network disorder. Connectivity in motor regions, somatosensory regions, and extra-motor regions are altered in patients with ALS. Connectivity in visual areas are also altered. Further, both motor and cognitive networks show decreased activation in ALS patients. The specific impaired networks include the Default Mode Network (DMN), sensorimotor network (SMN), fronto-parietal network (FPN), and salience network (SN). There is specifically decreased connectivity between the DMN and the SMN. Resting state functional connectivity (rsFC) in ALS patients is decreased and resting state networks interact with each other less.

=== Parkinson's disease ===
Parkinson's disease (PD) is a movement disorder that also causes cognitive decline in some cases. Parkison's patients have changed connectivity in the sensorimotor network (SMN), the visual network, the putamen in the subcortical network, and the cerebellum. Severity of symptoms in PD was also associated with temporal variability between the subcortical networks and the visual network, ventral, and dorsal attention networks. Primary motor cortex and supplementary motor areas are also less active in patients with PD. The frontoparietal (FP) network in patients with Parkinson's disease but without cognitive decline is more robust and resilient to network perturbation compared to those with cognitive decline. This suggests that the FP network can be a predictor of cognitive decline in Parkinson's patients. The FP control network also shows decreased network connectivity with other resting-state networks. PD patients with amnestic disturbances (processing speed and memory impairments) are more at risk of developing dementia. Network connectivity is decreased in patients with amnestic disturbances compared to those without. There is also evidence that a special PD network forms in patients with PD linking metabolically active areas in the cerebellum, pons, frontal cortex, and limbic regions. Thus, PD patients have increased small-world network connectivity.

=== Huntington's disease ===
Huntington's disease (HD) is an inherited neurological disorder which causes progressive motor, behavior, and cognitive decline. Patients with the gene causing HD have different connections in their default mode network (DMN). These patients have decreased connectivity between the anterior medial prefrontal cortex, the left inferior parietal and the posterior cingulate cortex. They also have increased connectivity between the two DMN subsystems. Decreased connectivity within the sensorimotor network (SMN) exists in early stages of HD and the visual network and attentional networks are affected later.

=== Sleep disorders ===
There are many types of sleep disorders. Sleep restriction (SR) is a consequence of not getting sufficient sleep and causes changes in structural network connectivity. Specifically, it targets the bilateral orbital part of the frontal gyri, superior occipital gyri, left insula, fusiform, right supplementary motor area, and cingulate gyrus. A study conducted on young males with less sleep also showed that there was increased connectivity within the somatomotor network (SMN) during rest. Insomnia is a condition where patients have difficulty falling asleep or staying asleep. There is evidence that insomnia involves distributed brain networks and causes increased structural connectivity around the right angular gyrus. A subnetwork that was centralized at the right angular gyrus and included frontal, temporal, and subcortical regions, showed enhanced connectivity in patients with insomnia. Further, the lapse in cognitive abilities after a certain period of total sleep deprivation is associated with increased coupling between the default mode network (DMN) and the salience network (SN). Sleep disturbances in adolescents may also be caused by increased grey matter volume in several large-scale networks.

=== Dementia ===
Dementia is a general term for loss of memory, language, problem-solving and other thinking abilities that are severe enough to interfere with daily life. Dementia is a general term in the same way that heart disease is a general term. Dementia is caused by damage to brain cells. This damage interferes with the ability of brain cells to communicate with each other. When brain cells cannot communicate normally, thinking, behavior and feelings can be affected. There are many signs of dementia. These signs can manifest as short-term memory, problems keeping track of items, and more. Usually, dementia is provoked by a "disconnection event" (e.g., a stroke) which disconnects one or more functional areas from a task-associated ensemble of functionally connected regions, resulting in a clinically observable "disconnection" syndrome.

The most common form of dementia is Alzheimer's disease. Alzheimer's disease (AD) is a progressive, neurodegenerative disease that can be clinically characterized by impaired memory and many other cognitive functions. Several recent studies have suggested that AD patients have disruptive neuronal integrity in large-scale structural and functional brain systems underlying high-level cognition, as demonstrated by a loss of small-world network characteristics. In Alzheimer's disease, high levels of certain proteins inside and outside brain cells make it hard for brain cells to stay healthy and to communicate with each other. The brain region first affected is the hippocampus. It begins specifically in the lateral entorhinal cortex, or LEC. The LEC is considered to be a gateway to the hippocampus, which plays a key role in the consolidation of long-term memory, among other functions. If the LEC is affected, other aspects of the hippocampus will also be affected. The hippocampus is the center of learning and memory in the brain, and the brain cells in this region are often the first to be damaged. That's why memory loss is often one of the earliest symptoms of Alzheimer's.

=== Epilepsy ===
Epilepsy is a brain network disorder. It is a brain disorder that causes recurring, unprovoked seizures. In an epileptic brain, certain networks have abnormal parameters at the molecular and cellular levels, due to genetic or to acquired pathogenic factors, rendering some essential parameters that control network stability extremely vulnerable to the influence of exogenous and endogenous factors. At the local neuronal network level, some hubs constituted by neurons and associated glia constitute oscillatory systems that became increasingly coupled at the transition to a seizure, thereby recruiting more distant neuronal networks, constituting complex oscillatory circuits, which can be recognized by EEG or MEG recordings.

Structural epilepsies in older children and adults most commonly present with focal seizures and have very similar symptoms from event to event. Focal seizures can be simple or complex. Simple focal seizures, also known as auras, occur in one area on one side of the brain, but may spread from there. The person does not lose consciousness during a simple focal seizure. Simple focal seizures with motor symptoms will affect muscle activity, causing jerking movements of a foot, the face, an arm or another part of the body. It may cause sensory symptoms affecting the senses, such as: hearing problems, hallucinations and olfactory or other distortions; as well as, affect the senses by causing hearing problems, hallucinations and olfactory or other distortions. It can also strike parts of the brain that trigger emotions or memories of previous experiences, causing feelings of fear, anxiety, or déjà vu (the illusory feeling that something has been experienced before). Complex focal seizures are often preceded by a simple focal seizure (aura). When experiencing a complex focal seizure, patients may stare blankly into space, or experience automatisms (non-purposeful, repetitive movements such as lip smacking, blinking, grunting, gulping or shouting).

In some cases, seizures can spread to both sides of the brain, leading to a generalized tonic-clonic seizure. Tonic-clonic seizures are seizures that affect the muscles. Tonic seizures cause a stiffening of muscles while clonic seizures are characterized by jerking or twitching. They are seizures that originate in both halves (hemispheres) of the brain simultaneously, causing stiffness or twitching throughout the body, known as a tonic or clonic seizure. A tonic or clonic seizure can also begin in one area of the brain (called a partial or focal seizure), affecting only one part of the body such as an arm or a leg. They can be partial or generalized.

A simple partial seizure is when the person knows what is happening and is somewhat aware of his or her surroundings and may be able to describe what happened. A complex partial seizure is when the person does not know what is happening, not aware of their surroundings, and does not know anything unusual has happened.

Some reports state that some epilepsy seizures are generalized, which means that the seizure starts in one area of the brain and then spreads but this is an outdated term because in cases of idiopathic generalised epilepsies (IGE) and childhood absence epilepsy (CAE) there is now compelling evidence that the seizures start in a well defined brain area and spread at great speed to connected brain areas recruiting specific neuronal networks into typical oscillatory behavior.

=== Stroke ===
A stroke, also known as transient ischemic attack or cerebrovascular accident, happens when blood flow to the brain is blocked. This prevents the brain from getting oxygen and nutrients from the blood. Without oxygen and nutrients, brain cells begin to die within minutes. Stroke causes focal brain lesions that disrupt functional connectivity (FC), a measure of activity synchronization, throughout distributed brain networks. The disruption in FC regions is caused by damage to cortical regions in the brain, which are various regions in the cerebral cortex. Strokes also cause a disconnection in the white matter of one's brain. It is shown that neurological deficits do not only arise from focal tissue damage but also from local and remote changes in white-matter tracts and in neural interactions among widespread networks.

=== Aphasia ===
Aphasia is a language disorder caused by damage in a specific area of the brain that controls language expression and comprehension. Aphasia can be the result of a stroke, head injury, brain tumor, dementia, etc. Aphasia can occur after a subacute stroke where there are alterations in the two distinct phase synchrony networks. There are many types of aphasia but the main types fall into three categories: Broca aphasia, Wernicke aphasia, and Global aphasia. In stroke patients, lesions affecting the Broca's area (inferior frontal gyrus or IFG), Wernicke's area (superior temporal gyrus or STG) and connecting white matter tracts, can lead to aphasia.

Broca aphasia is when there is damage to the front portion of the language-dominant side of the brain. It is the failure to express language. This region, located in the posterior inferior frontal gyrus of the dominant hemisphere at Brodmann areas 44 (pars opercularis) and 45 (pars triangularis), and the frontal lobe make up the Broca region. The Broca area is vital for language and also necessary for language repetition, gesture production, sentence grammar and fluidity, and the interpretation of others' actions. Lesions in the Broca's area in the IFG, the lower part of the precentral gyrus, and the opercular and insular regions are associated with naming difficulties and overall expressive language deficits in individuals with Broca's aphasia.

Wernicke aphasia is when there is damage to the side portion of the language-dominant part of the brain. Wernicke's aphasia is the failure to comprehend language. It is when there has been damage to the temporal lobe of the brain that it may result in Wernicke's aphasia, the most common type of fluent aphasia. People with Wernicke's aphasia may speak in long, complete sentences that have no meaning, adding unnecessary words and even creating made-up words. The most common cause of Wernicke's aphasia is an ischemic stroke affecting the posterior temporal lobe of the dominant hemisphere.

Global aphasia is when there is damage to a large portion of the language-dominant side of the brain. It is the result of damage to extensive portions of the language areas of the brain. Individuals with global aphasia have severe communication difficulties and may be extremely limited in their ability to speak or comprehend language. They may be unable to say even a few words or may repeat the same words or phrases over and over again. They may have trouble understanding even simple words and sentences. This aphasia is usually associated with a large lesion in the perisylvian area. The perisylvian area is the region around the lateral sulcus (Sylvian fissure) of the left hemisphere and includes Broca's area and Wernicke's area. Global aphasia is most commonly the result of a stroke in the middle cerebral artery that supplies blood to the lateral surface of the left hemisphere of the brain

== Personality disorders ==
=== Borderline personality disorder ===
Borderline personality disorder (BPD) is a relatively rare personality disorder, making up around 1.4% of the adult U.S. population, with women being disproportionately affected. BPD can be characterized by instability in self image, mood and behavior. Impulsivity, rapid mood swings, and unstable relationships with others are all indicators of BPD. Similar to other disorders, BPD can be influenced by many things such as genetic, environmental and societal factors, but researchers have been slowly uncovering potential neurobiological explanations for personality disorders as well. Current theories point to deficits in connectivity between three large scale brain networks, the Default Mode Network (DMN), the Salience Network (SN), and the medial temporal lobe network, which is associated with memory and processing of negative emotions. In particular in BPD, there appears to be aberrant connectivity between detection of salient stimuli as well as "self referential encoding" which results in "misidentification with neutral stimuli as well as a failure to integrate salience information with internal representations". Studies have also shown increased connectivity within the medial temporal lobe as well as between areas in the medial temporal lobe and areas in the salience network. The frontolimbic system also shows importance in preliminary studies, with researchers associating severity of BPD systems with severity of deficits in frontolimbic structures and connections. Research on neural correlates of BPD is very preliminary and more research needs to be done on how our brains connections can inform understanding on this disorder.

=== Obsessive–compulsive personality disorder ===
Obsessive–compulsive personality disorder (OCPD) is a personality disorder where the need for perfectionism in all aspects of life takes precedence. Despite the fact that OCPD is the most common personality disorder in the general population, published studies looking at the brain correlates of this disorder are practically nonexistent. In a recent study, ten individuals diagnosed with OCPD and ten healthy controls underwent a clinical assessment interview and a resting-state functional magnetic resonance imaging (fMRI) acquisition. The results show that OCPD patients presented an increased functional connectivity in the precuneus (i.e., a posterior node of the DMN), known to be involved in the retrieval manipulation of past events in order to solve current problems and develop plans for the future. These results suggest that this key node of the DMN may play an important role in OCPD. OCPD patients exhibit altered spontaneous neural activity as compared to healthy controls in multiple brain regions, which may reflect different characteristic symptoms of OCPD pathophysiology, including cognitive inflexibility, excessive self-control, lower empathy, and visual attention bias.

== Interoception and brain–body interactions ==
Interoception refers to the set of sensory processes through which the nervous system monitors the internal state of the body. Operating mostly at non-conscious levels, interoception emerges from the coordinated activity of distributed brain–body networks that integrate peripheral physiological signals. These signals are relayed through hierarchical and parallel pathways to interconnected brain subregions, where they are jointly processed to form a coherent and highly precise representation of bodily physiology.

Interoceptive information reaches the brain through a diversity of neural pathways, reflecting the multiplex and distributed nature of brain–body communication.

=== Brain–heart interactions ===
Brain–heart interactions exemplify large-scale brain–body coupling arising from dynamic, bidirectional exchanges between neural networks and cardiac control systems. These interactions are mediated by distributed circuits linking cortical and subcortical brain networks with brainstem autonomic pathways, supporting functions such as homeostatic regulation, emotion, and cognitive control. Quantifying brain–heart interactions therefore require network-level methodologies that capture multivariate and directional dependencies, including graph-based analyses, multilayer and temporal networks, and information-theoretic or causal models. These approaches enable the characterization of how cardiac dynamics shape brain network organization—and vice versa—across cognitive states and pathological conditions.

== See also ==
- Quantitative psychology
- Talairach coordinates
- Systems neuroscience
- Connectome
- Large-scale brain network
- Clinical neuroscience
- Evolutionary psychology
- Human Connectome Project
- Brain connectivity estimators
- Neural coding
- Brain atlas
- Outline of brain mapping
- Drosophila connectome
