= Sensorimotor network =

Network of the brain used for somatosensory-informed coordination of movement

The sensorimotor network (SMN), also known as the somatomotor network, is a large-scale brain network that integrates external sensory input with internal motor output to plan and coordinate voluntary movement. At its core, the SMN includes cortical regions such as: the primary motor cortex (M1, precentral gyrus), the primary somatosensory cortex (S1, postcentral gyrus), the premotor cortex and the supplementary motor area (SMA). Additionally, the auditory cortex and the visual cortex may be included in the SMN as well. The SMN is activated during motor tasks, such as finger tapping, indicating that the network readies the brain when performing and coordinating motor tasks.

== Connectivity & Interactions with other Brain Regions ==
As one of the brain's main neural networks, the SMN interacts with other cortical and subcortical regions in order to facilitate sensory processing and motor output everyday. More specifically, the SMN is involved in recurrent cortico-subcortical loops that involve the basal ganglia and cerebellum. Cortico-striato-thalamo-cortical (CSTC) circuits connect SMN cortical areas with subcortical regions such as the striatum, globus pallidus, and thalamus, allowing dopaminergic basal ganglia pathways (direct and indirect) to influence the selection and strength of our everyday motor output. At the same time, cortico-cerebello-thalamo-cortical (CCTC) loops connect sensorimotor and premotor cortices to the cerebellar cortex and deep nuclei, which are thought to be involved in facilitating smooth, voluntary, precise, and coordinated fine motor output.

At the cortical level, the SMN interacts with networks involved in attention, executive function, control, and valuation. Functional connectivity studies show associations between the SMN, dorsal attention and frontoparietal control networks during goal-directed actions, as well as interactions with limbic and salience networks when actions are driven by affective or reward cues. As one ages, the SMN activity becomes less segregated from these other networks, and these lines and boundaries separating the SMN from its neighboring association systems begin to blur. As a result, connectivity within these networks decreases, which correlates to reduced motor output and overall performance.

Abnormal patterns of connectivity between the SMN and these subcortical and associative networks are a recurring theme found across movement disorders. For example, imaging studies in patients with Parkinson's disease showed a decrease in functional connectivity within cortical SMN regions and a disruption in communication between SMN, basal ganglia, and cerebellar networks, all crucial for proper motor performance. Some modern treatment methods include dopaminergic medication or deep-brain stimulation to partially normalize some of these network changes and disruptions in motor performance.

== Clinical significance ==
Dysfunction in the SMN has been implicated in various neuropsychiatric disorders.

- Bipolar Disorder: The psychomotor disturbances that characterize the depressive and manic phases of bipolar disorder may be related to dysfunction in the sensorimotor network (SMN) and its balance with other large-scale networks such as the default mode network.
- Amyotrophic Lateral Sclerosis: Altered functional connectivity patterns in the SMN may contribute to various symptoms in the neurodegenerative disease .
- Parkinson's Disease: Functional neuroimaging studies in Parkinson's disease reveal that motor symptoms (such as bradykinesia and rigidity) are accompanied by abnormal SMN connectivity. Resting-state and task-based fMRI studies consistently report reduced functional connectivity between cortical SMN regions themselves (i.e. SMA, M1, S1, etc) as well as disrupted interactions between SMN and basal ganglia nuclei. These alterations could be a sign of a dopamine shortage in cortico-striato-thalamo-cortical loops (direct and indirect pathways) responsible for regulating motor output and performance. Some existing treatment methods include pharmacological dopamine replacement as well as deep brain stimulation that can partially restore more normal SMN connectivity patterns.
- Normal Aging: During healthy aging, the SMN shows reduced intra-network segregation (i.e. separation between SMA and M1) and increased communication with other large-scale networks. Studies found older adults showed less distinct SMN segmentation and weaker intra-network connectivity compared to young adults. Additionally, individuals with the least segregated SMN networks performed worse on sensorimotor tasks. Lower concentrations of GABA in S1 are associated with both reduced SMN segregation and poorer performance on tasks, suggesting that age-related changes in inhibitory neurotransmission may contribute to declining SMN segmentation and specialization, which then results in reduced behavioral performance.

== Nomenclature ==
In 2019, Uddin et al. proposed that pericentral network (PN) be used as a standard anatomical name for the network.
