= Attention network =

Attention network may refer to:

- Dorsal attention network, a network of brain regions involved in control of attention
- Ventral attention network, a network of brain regions involved in detection of stimuli
- Artificial neural networks used for attention (machine learning)
