= Computational models in epilepsy =

Computational models in epilepsy mainly focus on describing an electrophysiological manifestation associated with epilepsy called seizures. For this purpose, computational neurosciences use differential equations to reproduce the temporal evolution of the signals recorded experimentally. A book published in 2008, Computational Neuroscience in Epilepsy. summarizes different works done up to this time. The goals of using its models are diverse, from prediction to comprehension of underlying mechanisms.

The crisis phenomenon (seizure) exists and shares certain dynamical properties across different scales and different organisms. It is possible to distinguish different approaches: the phenomenological models focus on the dynamics observed, generally reduced to few dimension it facilitates the study from the point of view of the theory of dynamical systems and more mechanistic models that explain the biophysical interactions underlying seizures. It is also possible to use these approaches to model and analyse the interactions between different regions of the brain (In this case the notion of network plays an important role) and the transition to ictal state. These large-scale approaches have the advantage of being able to be related to the recordings made in humans thanks to electroencephalography (EEG). It offers new directions for clinical research, particularly as an additional tool in the treatment of refractory epilepsy

Other approaches are to use the models to try to understand the mechanisms underlying these seizures using biophysical descriptions from the neuron scale. This makes it possible to understand the role of homeostasis and to understand the link between physical quantities (such as the concentration of potassium for example) and the pathological dynamics observed.

This area of research has evolved rapidly in recent years and continues to show promise for our understanding and treatment of epilepsies for either for direct clinical application in the case of refractory epilepsy or fundamental research to guide experimental works.
