= Beat (music) =

Basic unit of time in music and music theory

Metric levels: beat level shown in middle with division levels above and multiple levels below.

In music and music theory, the beat is the basic unit of time, the pulse (regularly repeating event), of the mensural level (or beat level). The beat is often defined as the rhythm listeners would tap their toes to when listening to a piece of music, or the numbers a musician counts while performing, though in practice this may be technically incorrect (often the first multiple level). In popular use, beat can refer to a variety of related concepts, including pulse, tempo, meter, specific rhythms, and groove.

Rhythm in music is characterized by a repeating sequence of stressed and unstressed beats (often called "strong" and "weak") and divided into bars organized by time signature and tempo indications.

Beats are related to and distinguished from pulse, rhythm (grouping), and meter:

Meter is the measurement of the number of pulses between more or less regularly recurring accents. Therefore, in order for meter to exist, some of the pulses in a series must be accented—marked for consciousness—relative to others. When pulses are thus counted within a metric context, they are referred to as beats.

— Leonard B. Meyer and Cooper (1960)

Metric levels faster than the beat level are division levels, and slower levels are multiple levels. Beat has always been an important part of music. Some music genres such as funk will in general de-emphasize the beat, while others such as disco emphasize the beat to accompany dance.

== Division ==
As beats are combined to form measures, each beat is divided into parts. The nature of this combination and division is what determines meter. Music where two beats are combined is in duple meter, music where three beats are combined is in triple meter. Music where the beat is split in two are in simple meter, music where the beat is split in three are called compound meter. Thus, simple duple (2/4, 4/4, etc.), simple triple (3/4), compound duple (6/8), and compound triple (9/8). Divisions which require numbers, tuplets (for example, dividing a quarter note into five equal parts), are irregular divisions and subdivisions. Subdivision begins two levels below the beat level: starting with a quarter note or a dotted quarter note, subdivision begins when the note is divided into sixteenth notes.

== Downbeat and upbeat ==
Beginning of Bach's BWV 736, with upbeat (anacrusis) in red.

The downbeat is the first beat of the bar, i.e. number 1. The upbeat is the last beat in the previous bar which immediately precedes, and hence anticipates, the downbeat. Both terms correspond to the direction taken by the hand of a conductor.

This idea of directionality of beats is significant when you translate its effect on music. The crusis of a measure or a phrase is a beginning; it propels sound and energy forward, so the sound needs to lift and have forward motion to create a sense of direction. The anacrusis leads to the crusis, but doesn't have the same 'explosion' of sound; it serves as a preparation for the crusis.

An anticipatory note or succession of notes occurring before the first barline of a piece is sometimes referred to as an upbeat figure, section or phrase. Alternative expressions include "pickup" and "anacrusis" (the latter ultimately from Greek ana ["up towards"] and krousis ["strike"/"impact"] through French anacrouse). In English, anákrousis translates literally as "pushing up". The term anacrusis was borrowed from the field of poetry, in which it refers to one or more unstressed extrametrical syllables at the beginning of a line.

== On-beat and off-beat ==
Off-beat or backbeat pattern, popular on snare drum

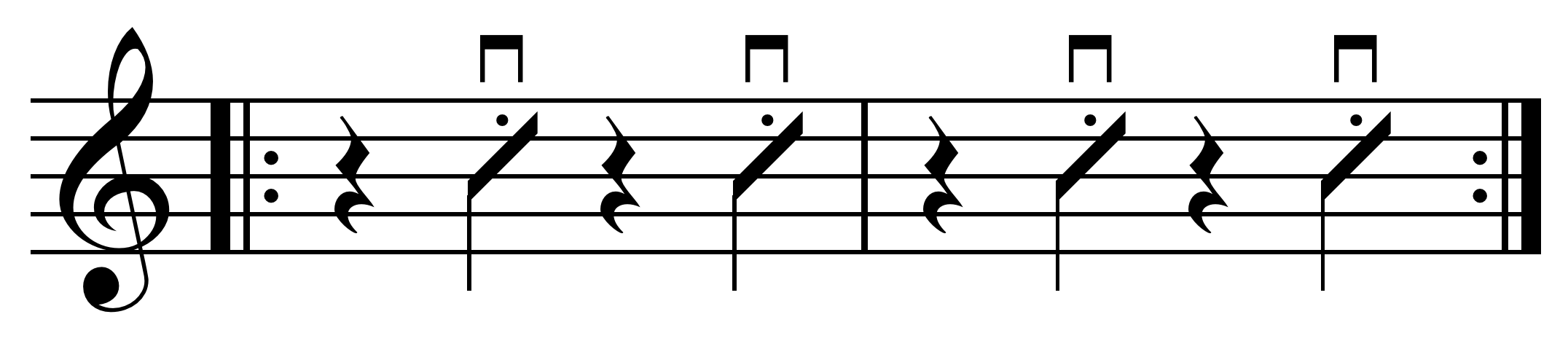
"Skank" guitar rhythm. Often referred to as "upbeats", in parallel with upstrokes.

In typical Western music 4/4 time, counted as "1 2 3 4, 1 2 3 4...", the first beat of the bar (downbeat) is usually the strongest accent in the melody and the likeliest place for a chord change, the third is the next strongest: these are "on" beats. The second and fourth are weaker—the "off-beats". Subdivisions (like eighth notes) that fall between the pulse beats are even weaker and these, if used frequently in a rhythm, can also make it "off-beat".

The effect can be easily simulated by evenly and repeatedly counting to four. As a background against which to compare these various rhythms a bass drum strike on the downbeat and a constant eighth note subdivision on ride cymbal have been added, which would be counted as follows (bold denotes a stressed beat):

- **1** 2 3 4 **1** 2 3 4 —
- **1** 2 **3** 4 **1** 2 **3** 4 — the stress here on the "on" beat

But one may syncopate that pattern and alternately stress the odd and even beats, respectively:

- 1 **2** 3 **4** 1 **2** 3 **4** — the stress on the "unexpected", or syncopated, beat

So "off-beat" is a musical term, commonly applied to syncopation, that emphasizes the weak even beats of a bar, as opposed to the usual on-beat. This is a fundamental technique of African polyrhythm that transferred to popular western music. According to Grove Music, the "Offbeat is [often] where the downbeat is replaced by a rest or is tied over from the preceding bar". The downbeat can never be the off-beat because it is the strongest beat in 4/4 time. Certain genres tend to emphasize the off-beat, where this is a defining characteristic of rock'n'roll and ska music.

== Backbeat ==
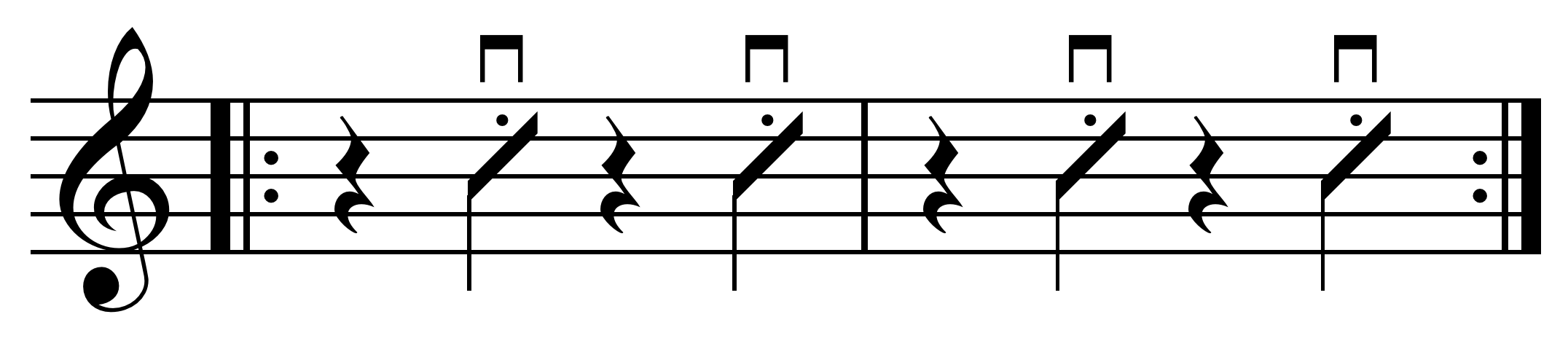
Back beat

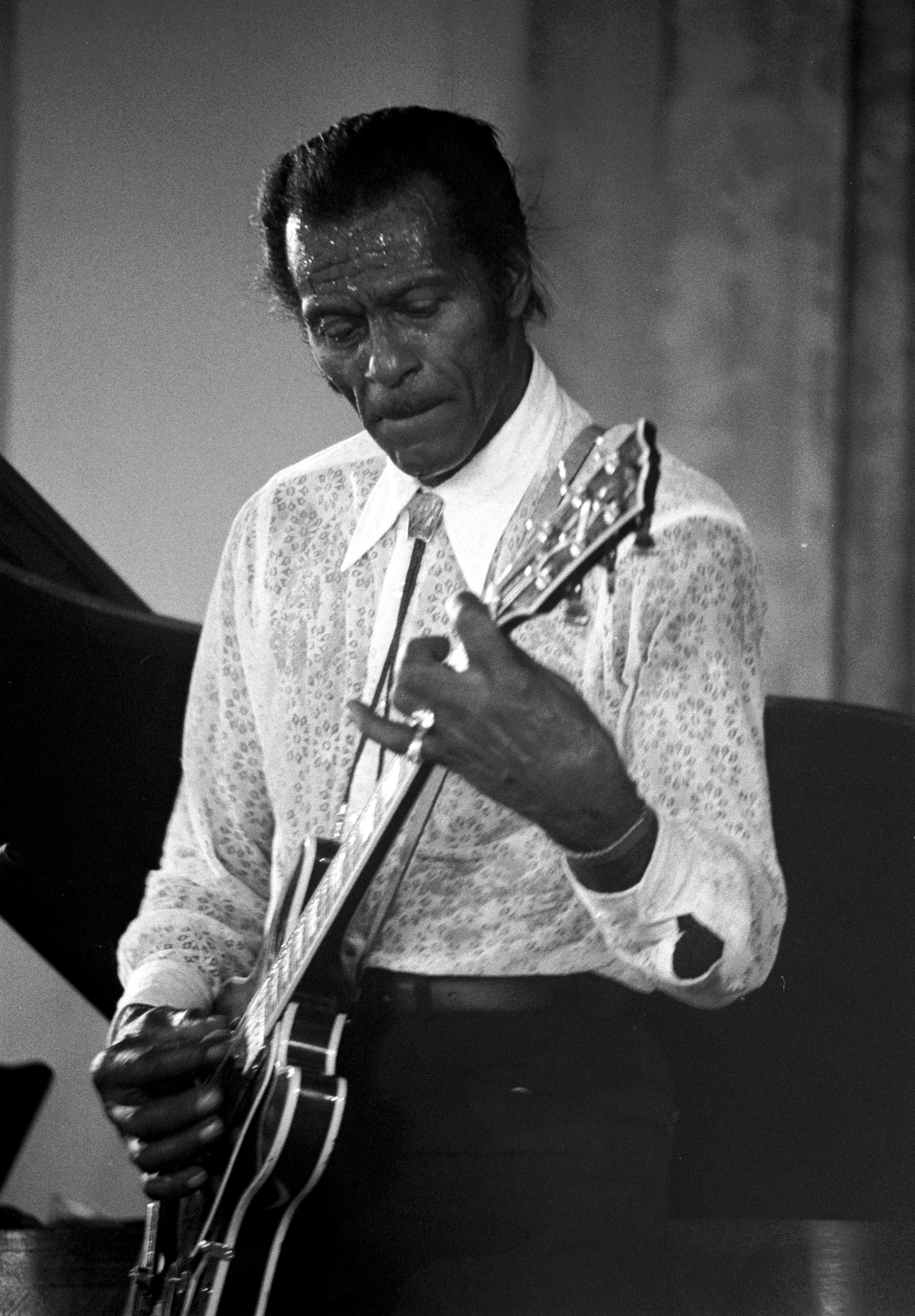
"It's got a backbeat, you can't lose it" – Chuck Berry, "Rock and Roll Music"

A back beat, or backbeat, is a syncopated accentuation on the "off" beat. In a simple 4/4 rhythm these are beats 2 and 4.

"A big part of R&B's attraction had to do with the stompin' backbeats that make it so eminently danceable," according to the Encyclopedia of Percussion. An early record with an emphasised back beat throughout was "Good Rockin' Tonight" by Wynonie Harris in 1948. Although drummer Earl Palmer claimed the honor for "The Fat Man" by Fats Domino in 1949, which he played on, saying he adopted it from the final "shout" or "out" chorus common in Dixieland jazz. There is a hand-clapping back beat on "Roll 'Em Pete" by Pete Johnson and Big Joe Turner, recorded in 1938. A distinctive back beat can be heard on "Back Beat Boogie" by Harry James And His Orchestra, recorded in late 1939. Other early recorded examples include the final verse of "Grand Slam" by Benny Goodman in 1942 and some sections of The Glenn Miller Orchestra's "(I've Got A Gal In) Kalamazoo", while amateur direct-to-disc recordings of Charlie Christian jamming at Minton's Playhouse around the same time have a sustained snare-drum backbeat on the hottest choruses.

Outside U.S. popular music, there are early recordings of music with a distinctive backbeat, such as the 1949 recording of Mangaratiba by Luiz Gonzaga in Brazil.

Delayed backbeat (last eighth note in each measure) as in funk music

Slap bass executions on the backbeat are found in styles of country western music of the 1930s, and the late 1940s early 1950s music of Hank Williams reflected a return to strong backbeat accentuation as part of the honky tonk style of country. In the mid-1940s "hillbilly" musicians the Delmore Brothers were turning out boogie tunes with a hard driving back beat, such as the No. 2 hit "Freight Train Boogie" in 1946, as well as in other boogie songs they recorded. Similarly Fred Maddox's characteristic backbeat, a slapping bass style, helped drive a rhythm that came to be known as rockabilly, one of the early forms of rock and roll. Maddox had used this style as early as 1937.

In today's popular music the snare drum is typically used to play the backbeat pattern. Additionally, hand claps and stacked cymbals can fulfil this purpose. A hi-hat is often used as a softer alternative in jazz. Early funk music often delayed one of the backbeats by an eighth note so as "to give a 'kick' to the [overall] beat".

Some songs, such as The Beatles' "Please Please Me" and "I Want to Hold Your Hand", The Knack's "Good Girls Don't" and Blondie's cover of The Nerves' "Hanging on the Telephone", employ a double backbeat pattern. In a double backbeat, one of the off beats is played as two eighth notes rather than one quarter note.

Some drummers slightly delay the backbeat on the snare drum to create a more relaxed feel, a technique known as the "delayed" or "late backbeat." In such cases, the intervals between beats 2 and 3, and between beats 4 and 1, are slightly shortened to prevent the tempo from slowing down. This playing style is particularly common in rock and soul music from the late 1960s to the mid-1970s. Notable examples can be heard in recordings such as "Green Onions" by Booker T. & the M.G.'s, "And Your Bird Can Sing" by The Beatles, "Hey Joe" by The Jimi Hendrix Experience, and "Easy" by The Commodores. Drummer Charlie Watts of The Rolling Stones frequently employed this technique during this period, as heard in tracks like "Monkey Man," "Wild Horses," "Sister Morphine," and "Let It Bleed." A delayed backbeat can also be heard in the famous eight-bar "Funky Drummer" break, played by Clyde Stubblefield. Early backbeats can be heard in Bruce Springsteen's "The River," The Police's "Every Breath You Take," and D'Angelo's "The Line."

== Cross-beat ==
Cross-rhythm. A rhythm in which the regular pattern of accents of the prevailing meter is contradicted by a conflicting pattern and not merely a momentary displacement that leaves the prevailing meter fundamentally unchallenged

—New Harvard Dictionary of Music (1986: 216).

== Hyperbeat ==
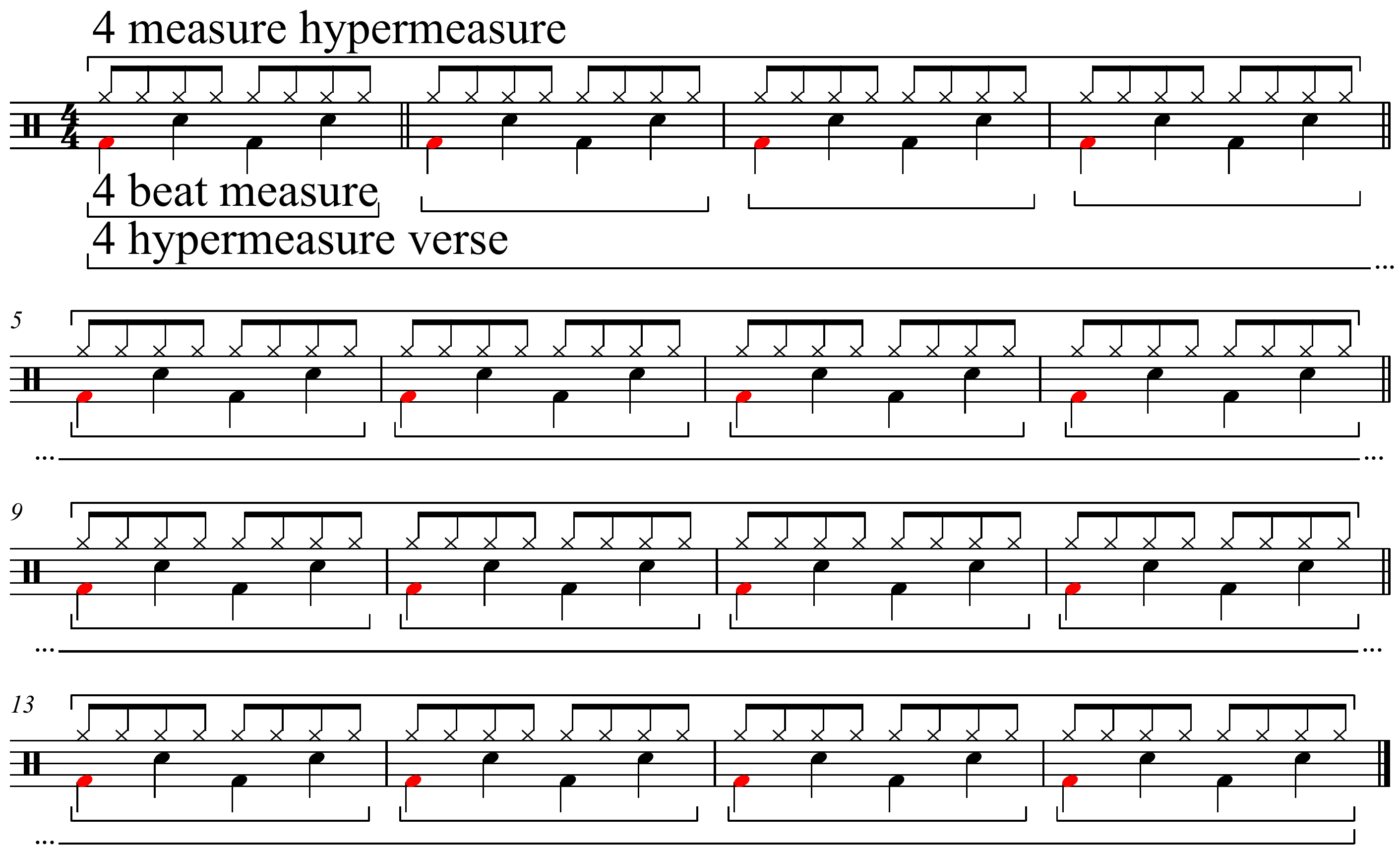
Hypermeter: 4 beat measure, 4 measure hypermeasure, and 4 hypermeasure verses. Hyperbeats in red.

A hyperbeat is one unit of hypermeter, generally a measure. "Hypermeter is meter, with all its inherent characteristics, at the level where measures act as beats."

== Beat perception ==
Beat perception refers to the human ability to extract a periodic time structure from a piece of music. This ability is evident in the way people instinctively move their body in time to a musical beat, made possible by a form of sensorimotor synchronization called 'beat-based timing'. This involves identifying the beat of a piece of music and timing the frequency of movements to match it. Infants across cultures display a rhythmic motor response but it is not until between the ages of 2 years 6 months and 4 years 6 months that they are able to match their movements to the beat of an auditory stimulus.

== Related concepts ==
- Tatum refers to a subdivision of a beat which represents the "time division that most highly coincides with note onsets".
- Afterbeat refers to a percussion style where a strong accent is sounded on the second, third and fourth beats of the bar, following the downbeat.
- In reggae music, the term one drop refers to the complete de-emphasis (to the point of silence) of the first beat in the cycle.
- James Brown's signature funk groove emphasized the downbeat – that is, with heavy emphasis "on the one" (the first beat of every measure) – to etch his distinctive sound, rather than the back beat (familiar to many R&B musicians) which places the emphasis on the second beat.

== See also ==
- Mensural notation
