= James S. Hyde =

American biophysicist

James S. Hyde (May 20, 1932 – August 13, 2022) was an American biophysicist. He held the James S. Hyde chair in Biophysics at the Medical College of Wisconsin (MCW) where he specialized in magnetic resonance instrumentation and methodology development in two distinct areas: electron paramagnetic resonance (EPR) spectroscopy and magnetic resonance imaging (MRI). He is senior author of the widely cited 1995 paper by B.B. Biswal et al. reporting the discovery of resting state functional connectivity (fcMRI) in the human brain. He also served as Director of the National Biomedical EPR Center, a Research Resource supported by the National Institutes of Health. He was author of more than 400 peer-reviewed papers and review articles and held 35 U.S. Patents. He was recognized by Festschrifts in both EPR and fcMRI.

== Education and career ==
Dr. Hyde was born in 1932 in Mitchell, South Dakota. He received his BS degree from the Massachusetts Institute of Technology (MIT) in physics in 1954. He continued his studies at MIT and received his PhD degree in solid-state physics in the laboratory of Professor Arthur R. von Hippel in 1959. He was employed that year by the Analytical Instrument Division of Varian Associates in Palo Alto, California. In this capacity, he has been credited with leading the evolution of EPR spectroscopy from applications in physics to applications in chemistry and biology. His colleagues at Varian were well known in the field of nuclear magnetic resonance (NMR): M.E. Packard, Richard R. Ernst, W. A. Anderson, R. Freeman, which may have influenced his later research in MRI. In 1975 he was recruited by H. M. Swartz to join the faculty of the Medical College of Wisconsin. The partnership of Hyde and Swartz led to successful NIH funding of a Research Resource in EPR. Dr. Hyde later became involved in early TR&D research in the field of MRI through long-standing interactions between MCW and General Electric Medical Systems based in Milwaukee, WI. Dr. Hyde has mentored a number of PhD students who have successful academic careers in both MRI and EPR.

== Research in EPR ==
While at Varian, Dr. Hyde and his colleagues extended the technique of electron nuclear double resonance (ENDOR), which had been introduced by G. Feher for the study of donors in silicon, to the liquid phase, to unordered solids, to flavoproteins and to copper proteins. He introduced the technique of electron-electron double resonance (ELDOR) for the study of spectral connectivity in fluids. He discovered a way to measure very slow rotational diffusion of proteins, and also introduced the EPR pulse technique known as saturation recovery for the measurement of electron spin lattice relaxation times of free radicals and spin labels in the fluid phase.

At MCW, a key advance was a novel sample-containing structure which became known as the loop-gap resonator (LGR). It was an enabling structure for the extension of EPR spectroscopy to a range of microwave frequencies from 500 MHz to 140 GHz. In addition, the technique of saturation recovery was further developed across most of this range of microwave frequencies, which led to an extensive body of work on transport and cellular consumption of oxygen. Pulse experiments on oxygen transport at 90 GHz are particularly notable because of the small sample volume, about 20 nL.

== Research in MRI, fMRI and fcMRI ==
In MRI, Dr. Hyde recognized that the LGR technology of EPR could be extended to radio frequency (RF) surface coils for improved diagnostic radiology. The principle was established that the best images were obtained by designing special RF coils with dimensions that corresponded to the anatomy that was of interest. He also introduced to MRI the first report on parallel acquisition of MRI data from multiple non-interacting surface coils. Gradient coils are required in order to make an image, and it was natural to consider use of a local gradient coil that was tailored to the anatomy of interest. A local RF coil inside of a local gradient coil was developed for the human wrist. The configuration was then extended to the human head, which led to one of the first papers on human functional MRI (fMRI). This paper was followed by several early fMRI neuroscience papers from MCW. Strong neuroscience at MCW based on reference Bandettini et al. led to the funding of a Program Project at MCW by the National Institute of Mental Health. Dr. Hyde served for 10 years as Program Director. The same equipment also was used in the discovery of MRI resting state human functional connectivity (fcMRI), a very heavily cited paper that led to the founding of a new journal: Brain Connectivity, and the funding of the Human Connectome Project. In current work, the basic coil design is being used by Dr. Hyde for fMRI and fcMRI studies of connectivity in rat brain at a field strength of 9.4 Tesla and a resolution of 200 microns in each dimension.

== Personal life ==
Hyde and his wife, Karen, were significant contributors to the building of Wisconsin art's reputation and were instrumental in the development of a new building for the Museum of Wisconsin Art, based in West Bend, Wisconsin.http://www.wisconsinart.org/ An award based in their honor was established in 2015 to recognize their contributions in this area. http://www.wisconsinart.org/exhibitions/gifts-of-the-hydes.aspx

James S. Hyde died on August 13, 2022, at the age of 90.

== Awards and recognition ==
- Fellow of the American Physical Society, 1975
- Co-Chairman, XIII International Conference on Magnetic Resonance in Biological Systems, 1988
- Doctoris Honoris Causa, Jagiellonian University, Kraków, Poland, 1989
- MERIT Award, National institute of General Medical Sciences, 1989
- Bruker Prize of the Royal Society of Chemistry, United Kingdom, 1989
- Gold Medal Award, International EPR Society, 1993
- Zavoisky Award, Russian Academy of Sciences, Kazan, 1995
- Fellow of the International Society of Magnetic Resonance in Medicine, 1996
- Gold Medal Award, International Society of Magnetic Resonance in Medicine, 1999
- 2002 Fellow of the International EPR Society
- Distinguished Service Awards, Medical College of Wisconsin, 2008
- Fellow, ISMAR (International Society of Magnetic Resonance), 2008
- MIT Club of Wisconsin Technology Achievement Award, 2009
- Chair awarded: The James S. Hyde Professor of Biophysics, Medical College of Wisconsin, 2009
- T. Michael Bolger Award, Medical College of Wisconsin, 2012
