= Resting state fMRI =

Type of functional magnetic resonance imaging

- Movie of the in vivo BOLD signal from the cortical surface of a human subject from HCP, acquired using resting state fMRI, pre-processed to suppress the noise in data and played back at a real-time rate. The BOLD signal intensities are visualized on a smoothed cortical surface. At each point on the cortex, white color represents the average BOLD signal, while blue and red colors represents lower and higher signal than average BOLD signal respectively.
- Purpose: Evaluate regional interactions that occur in resting state(brain mapping)

Resting state fMRI (rs-fMRI or R-fMRI), also referred to as task-independent fMRI or task-free fMRI, is a method of functional magnetic resonance imaging (fMRI) that is used in brain mapping to evaluate regional interactions that occur in a resting or task-negative state, when an explicit task is not being performed. A number of resting-state brain networks have been identified, one of which is the default mode network. These brain networks are observed through changes in blood flow in the brain which creates what is referred to as a blood-oxygen-level dependent (BOLD) signal that can be measured using fMRI.

Because brain activity is intrinsic, present even in the absence of an externally prompted task, any brain region will have spontaneous fluctuations in BOLD signal. The resting state approach is useful to explore the brain's functional organization and to examine if it is altered in neurological or mental disorders. Because of the resting state aspect of this imaging, data can be collected from a range of patient groups including people with intellectual disabilities, pediatric groups, and even those that are unconscious. Resting-state functional connectivity research has revealed a number of networks which are consistently found in healthy subjects, different stages of consciousness and across species, and represent specific patterns of synchronous activity.

== Basics of resting state fMRI ==
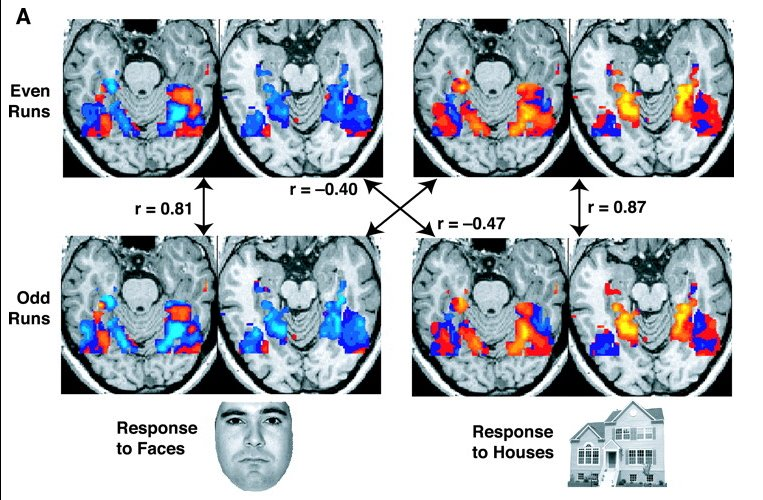
These fMRI images are from a study showing parts of the brain lighting up on seeing houses and other parts on seeing faces. The 'r' values are correlations, with higher positive or negative values indicating a better match.

Functional magnetic resonance imaging (functional MRI or fMRI) is a specific magnetic resonance imaging (MRI) procedure that measures brain activity by detecting associated changes in blood flow. More specifically, brain activity is measured through low frequency BOLD signal in the brain.

The procedure is similar to MRI but uses the change in magnetization between oxygen-rich and oxygen-poor blood as its basic measure. This measure is frequently corrupted by noise from various sources and hence statistical procedures are used to extract the underlying signal. The resulting brain activation can be presented graphically by color-coding the strength of activation across the brain or the specific region studied. The technique can localize activity to within millimeters but, using standard techniques, no better than within a window of a few seconds.

FMRI is used both in research, and to a lesser extent, in clinical settings. It can also be combined and complemented with other measures of brain physiology such as EEG, NIRS, and functional ultrasound. Arterial spin labeling fMRI can be used as a complementary approach for assessing resting brain functions.

== Physiological basis ==
The physiological blood-flow response largely decides the temporal sensitivity, how well neurons that are active can be measured in BOLD fMRI. The basic time resolution parameter is the sampling rate, or TR, which dictates how often a particular brain slice is excited and allowed to lose its magnetization. TRs could vary from the very short (500 ms) to the very long (3 seconds). For fMRI specifically, the haemodynamic response is assumed to last over 10 seconds, rising multiplicatively (that is, as a proportion of current value), peaking at 4 to 6 seconds, and then falling multiplicatively. Changes in the blood-flow system, the vascular system, integrate responses to neuronal activity over time. Because this response is a smooth continuous function, sampling with faster TRs helps only to map faster fluctuations like respiratory and heart rate signals.

While fMRI strives to measure the neuronal activity in the brain, the BOLD signal can be influenced by many other physiological factors other than neuronal activity. For example, respiratory fluctuations and cardiovascular cycles affect the BOLD signal being measured in the brain and therefore are usually tried to be removed during processing of the raw fMRI data. Due to these sources of noise, there have been many experts who have approached the idea of resting state fMRI very skeptically during the early uses of fMRI. It has only been very recently that researchers have become confident that the signal being measured is not an artifact caused by other physiological function.

Resting state functional connectivity between spatially distinct brain regions reflects the repeated history of co-activation patterns within these regions, thereby serving as a measure of plasticity.

== History ==
Bharat Biswal

In 1992, Bharat Biswal started his work as a graduate student at The Medical College of Wisconsin under the direction of his advisor, James S. Hyde, and discovered that the brain, even during rest, contains information about its functional organization. He had used fMRI to study how different regions of the brain communicate while the brain is at rest and not performing any active task. Though at the time, Biswal's research was mostly disregarded and attributed to another signal source, his resting neuroimaging technique has now been widely replicated and considered a valid method of mapping functional brain networks. Mapping the brain's activity while it is at rest holds many potentials for brain research and even helps doctors diagnose various diseases of the brain.

Marcus Raichle

Experiments by neurologist Marcus Raichle's lab at Washington University School of Medicine and other groups showed that the brain's energy consumption is increased by less than 5% of its baseline energy consumption while performing a focused mental task. These experiments showed that the brain is constantly active with a high level of activity even when the person is not engaged in focused mental work (the resting state). His lab has been primarily focused on finding the basis of this resting activity and is credited with many groundbreaking discoveries. These include the relative independence of blood flow and oxygen consumption during changes in brain activity, which provided the physiological basis of fMRI, as well the discovery of the well known Default Mode Network.

== Connectivity ==
=== Functional ===
Functional connectivity is the connectivity between brain regions that share functional properties. More specifically, it can be defined as the temporal correlation between spatially remote neurophysiological events, expressed as deviation from statistical independence across these events in distributed neuronal groups and areas. This applies to both resting state and task-state studies. While functional connectivity can refer to correlations across subjects, runs, blocks, trials, or individual time points, resting state functional connectivity focuses on connectivity assessed across individual BOLD time points during resting conditions. Functional connectivity has also been evaluated using the perfusion time series sampled with arterial spin labeled perfusion fMRI. Functional connectivity MRI (fcMRI), which can include resting state fMRI and task-based MRI, might someday help provide more definitive diagnoses for mental health disorders such as bipolar disorder and may also aid in understanding the development and progression of post-traumatic stress disorder as well as evaluate the effect of treatment. Functional connectivity has been suggested to be an expression of the network behavior underlying high level cognitive function partially because unlike structural connectivity, functional connectivity often changes on the order of seconds as in the case of dynamic functional connectivity.

Successful cognitive performance depends not only on the activity of individual brain regions but also on the coordinated communication between them. Functional connectivity enables distributed brain networks to exchange information, allowing attention, cognitive control, and goal-directed behavior to be coordinated efficiently during complex tasks. This was demonstrated in a study that showed multitasking consistently recruits a shared frontoparietal network involved in cognitive control, including the bilateral intraparietal sulcus (IPS), dorsal premotor cortex (dPMC), and anterior insula. These brain regions support the coordination of attention, response selection, and goal maintenance across multiple tasks. Although dual-tasking and task-switching each recruit additional specialized regions, the shared frontoparietal network provides the functional foundation for coordinating complex behaviour.

== Networks ==
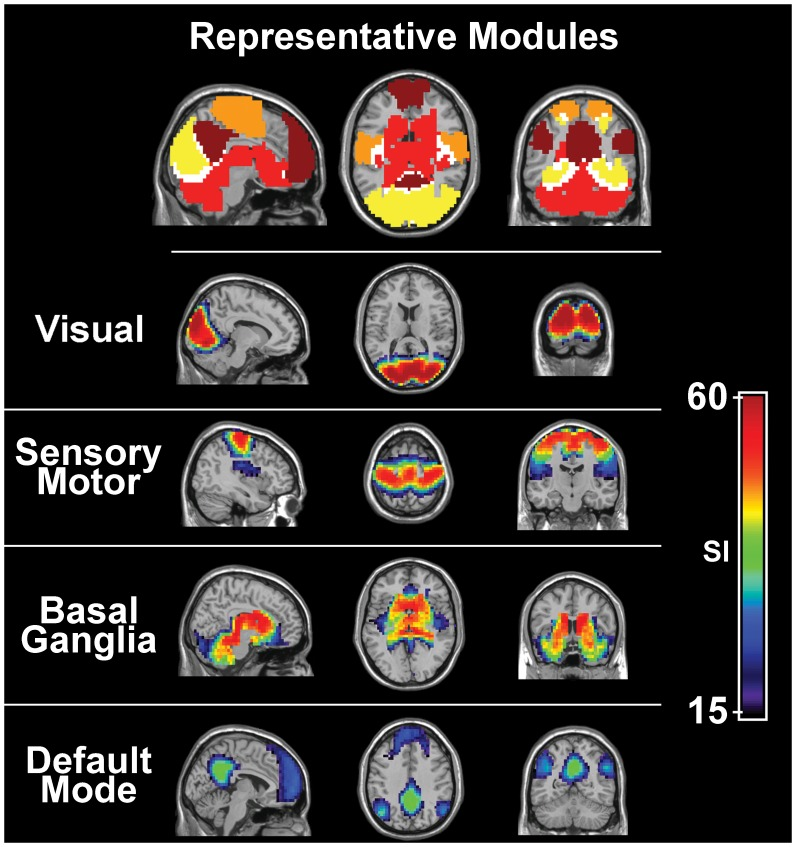
Study showing four functional networks that were found to be highly consistent across subjects. These modules include the visual (yellow), sensory/motor (orange) and basal ganglia (red) cortices as well as the default mode network (posterior cingulate, inferior parietal lobes, and medial frontal gyrus; maroon).

=== Default mode network ===
The default mode network (DMN) is a network of brain regions that are active when an individual is awake and at rest. The default mode network is an interconnected and anatomically defined brain system that preferentially activates when individuals focus on internal tasks such as daydreaming, envisioning the future, retrieving memories, and gauging others' perspectives. It is negatively correlated with brain systems that focus on external visual signals. It is one of the most studied networks present during resting state and is one of the most easily visualized networks.

=== Other resting state networks ===
Depending on the method of resting state analysis, functional connectivity studies have reported a number of neural networks that result to be strongly functionally connected during rest. The key networks, also referred as components, which are more frequently reported include: the DMN, the sensory/motor networks, the central executive network (CEN), up to three different visual networks, a ventral and dorsal attention network, the auditory network and the limbic network. As already reported, these resting-state networks consist of anatomically separated, but functionally connected regions displaying a high level of correlated BOLD signal activity. These networks are found to be quite consistent across studies, despite differences in the data acquisition and analysis techniques. Importantly, most of these resting-state components represent known functional networks, that is, regions that are known to share and support cognitive functions.

== Analyzing data ==
=== Processing data ===
Many programs exist for the processing and analyzing of resting state fMRI data. Some of the most commonly used programs include SPM, AFNI, FSL (esp. Melodic for ICA), CONN, C-PAC, and Connectome Computation System (CCS).

=== Methods of analysis ===
There are many methods of both acquiring and processing rsfMRI data. The most popular methods of analysis focus either on independent components or on regions of correlation.

==== Independent component analysis ====
Independent component analysis (ICA) is a useful statistical approach in the detection of resting state networks. ICA separates a signal into non-overlapping spatial and time components. It is highly data-driven and allows for better removal of noisy components of the signal (motion, scanner drift, etc.). It also has been shown to reliably extract default mode network as well as many other networks with very high consistency. ICA remains in the forefront of the research methods.

==== Regional analysis ====
Other methods of observing networks and connectivity in the brain include the seed-based d mapping and region of interest (ROI) methods of analysis. In these cases, signal from only a certain voxel or cluster of voxels known as the seed or ROI are used to calculate correlations with other voxels of the brain. This provides a much more precise and detailed look at specific connectivity in brain areas of interest. This can also be performed across the entire brain by utilizing an atlas, making it easier to define ROI's and measure connectivity. In 2021, Yeung and colleagues conducted a regional analysis utilizing a modified version of the Human Connectome Project (HCP) atlas, and found changes in the functional connectome of stroke patients during rehabilitative treatment. Overall connectivity between an ROI (such as the prefrontal cortex) and all other voxels of the brain can also be averaged, providing a measure of global brain connectivity (GBC) specific to that ROI. Other methods for characterizing resting-state networks include partial correlation, coherence and partial coherence, phase relationships, dynamic time warping distance, clustering, and graph theory.

=== Reliability and reproducibility ===
Resting-state functional magnetic resonance imaging (rfMRI) can image low-frequency fluctuations in the spontaneous brain activities, representing a popular tool for macro-scale functional connectomics to characterize inter-individual differences in normal brain function, mind-brain associations, and the various disorders. This suggests reliability and reproducibility for commonly used rfMRI-derived measures of the human brain functional connectomics. These metrics hold great potentials of accelerating biomarker identification for various brain diseases, which call the need of addressing reliability and reproducibility at first place.

== Combining imaging techniques ==
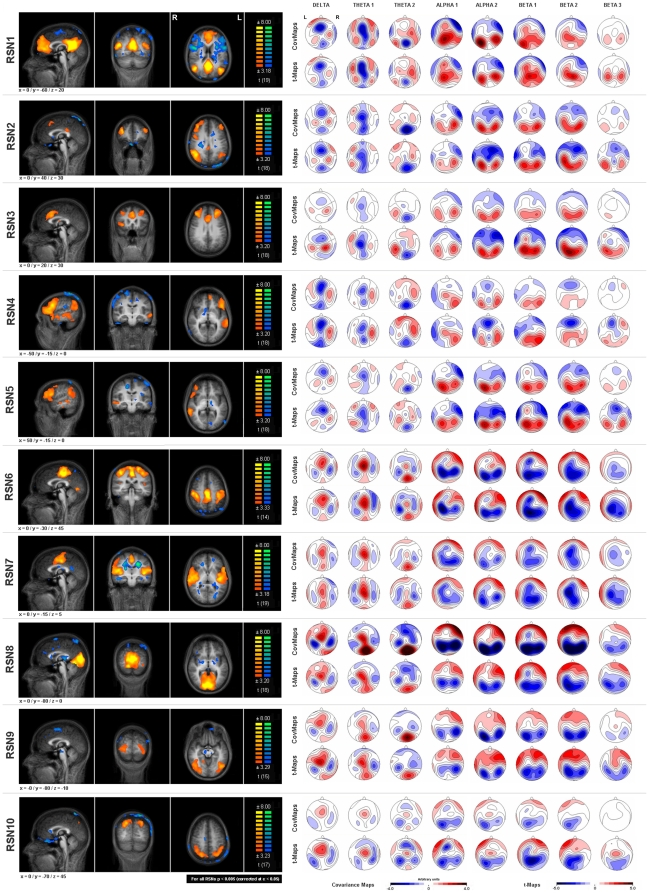
This image is from a study using both fMRI and EEG acquisition at the resting state. The left row shows sagittal, coronal and horizontal slices of the ten RSNs. On the right side the covariance and t-maps for the 8 frequency bands are displayed.

=== fMRI with DWI ===
With fMRI providing functional and DWI structural information about the brain, these two imaging techniques are commonly used in conjunction to provide a holistic view of brain network interactions. When collected from defined ROI's, fMRI data informs researchers of how activity (blood flow) in the brain changes over time or during a task. This is then bolstered through structural DWI data, which shows how individual white matter tracts connect these ROI's. Investigations harnessing these techniques have progressed the field of network neuroscience, by further defining groups of regions in the brain which connect both structurally (having white matter tracts pass between them), and functionally (showing similar or opposite patterns of activity over time), into brain networks like the DMN. Advances in topological data analysis have established a coherent statistical framework for integrating functional and structural information, represented as functional and structural brain networks with distinct topologies.

This combined data provides unique clinical and neuropsychiatric benefit, by enabling the investigation of how brain networks are disturbed, or white matter pathways compromised, by the presence of mental illness or structural damage. Altered brain network connectivity has been shown across a swathe of disorders, such as Schizophrenia, Depression, Stroke, and brain tumor, underpinning their unique symptoms.

=== fMRI with EEG ===
Many imaging experts feel that in order to obtain the best combination of spatial and temporal information from brain activity, both fMRI as well as electroencephalography (EEG) should be used simultaneously. This dual technique combines the EEG's well documented ability to characterize certain brain states with high temporal resolution and to reveal pathological patterns, with fMRI's (more recently discovered and less well understood) ability to image blood dynamics through the entire brain with high spatial resolution. Up to now, EEG-fMRI has been mainly seen as an fMRI technique in which the synchronously acquired EEG is used to characterize brain activity ('brain state') across time allowing to map (through statistical parametric mapping, for example) the associated haemodynamic changes.

The clinical value of these findings is the subject of ongoing investigations, but recent researches suggest an acceptable reliability for EEG-fMRI studies and better sensitivity in higher field scanner. Outside the field of epilepsy, EEG-fMRI has been used to study event-related (triggered by external stimuli) brain responses and provided important new insights into baseline brain activity during resting wakefulness and sleep.

=== fMRI with TMS ===
Transcranial magnetic stimulation (TMS) uses small and relatively precise magnetic fields to stimulate regions of the cortex without dangerous invasive procedures. When these magnetic fields stimulate an area of the cortex, focal blood flow increases at the site of stimulation as well as at distant sites anatomically connected to the stimulated location. Positron emission tomography (PET) can then be used to image the brain and changes in blood flow and results show very similar regions of connectivity confirming networks found in fMRI studies and TMS can also be used to support and provide more detailed information on the connected regions.

== Potential pitfalls ==
Potential pitfalls when using rsfMRI to determine functional network integrity are contamination of the BOLD signal by sources of physiological noise such as heart rate, respiration, and head motion. These confounding factors can often bias results in studies where patients are compared to healthy controls in the direction of hypothesized effects, for example a lower coherence might be found in the default network in the patient group, while the patient groups also moved more during the scan. Also, it has been shown that the use of global signal regression can produce artificial correlations between a small number of signals (e.g., two or three). Fortunately, the brain has many signals.

== Current and future applications ==
Research using resting state fMRI has the potential to be applied in clinical context, including use in the assessment of many different diseases and mental disorders.

=== Disease condition and changes in resting state functional connectivity ===
- Alzheimer's disease: decreased connectivity
- Mild cognitive impairment: abnormal connectivity
- Autism: altered connectivity
- Depression and effects of antidepressant treatment: abnormal connectivity
- Bipolar disorder and effects of mood stabilizers: abnormal connectivity and network properties
- Schizophrenia: disrupted networks
- Attention deficit hyperactivity disorder (ADHD): altered "small networks" and thalamus changes
- Aging brain: disruption of brain systems and motor network
- Epilepsy: disruption and decrease/increase in connectivity
- Parkinson's disease: altered connectivity
- Obsessive compulsive disorder: increase/decrease in connectivity
- Pain disorder: altered connectivity
- Anorexia nervosa: connectivity alterations within corticolimbic circuitry and of insular cortex

Other types of current and future clinical applications for resting state fMRI include identifying group differences in brain disease, obtaining diagnostic and prognostic information, longitudinal studies and treatment effects, clustering in heterogeneous disease states, and pre-operative mapping and targeting intervention. Due to its lack of reliance on task performance and cognitive demands, resting state fMRI can be a useful tool in assessing brain alterations in disorders of impaired consciousness and cognition, as well as paediatric populations.

== See also ==
- Connectomics
- Neuroimaging
- List of functional connectivity software
- Medical image computing
