= Frontoparietal network =

Large-scale brain network involved in sustained attention and complex cognition

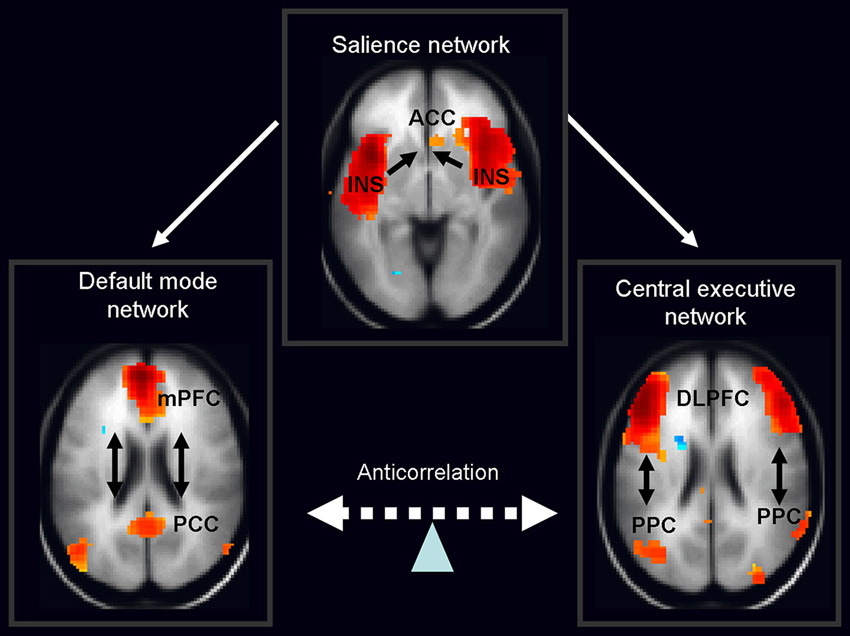
The salience network is theorised to mediate switching between the default mode network and frontoparietal network (central executive network).

The frontoparietal network (FPN), generally also known as the central executive network (CEN) or, more specifically, the lateral frontoparietal network (L-FPN) (see Nomenclature), is a large-scale brain network primarily composed of the dorsolateral prefrontal cortex and posterior parietal cortex, around the intraparietal sulcus. It is involved in sustained attention, complex problem-solving and working memory.

The FPN is one of three networks in the so-called triple-network model, along with the salience network and the default mode network (DMN). The salience network facilitates switching between the FPN and DMN.

== Anatomy ==
The FPN is primarily composed of the rostral lateral and dorsolateral prefrontal cortex (especially the middle frontal gyrus) and the anterior inferior parietal lobule. Additional regions include the middle cingulate gyrus and potentially the dorsal precuneus, posterior inferior temporal lobe, dorsomedial thalamus and the head of the caudate nucleus.

== Function ==
The FPN is involved in executive function and goal-oriented, cognitively demanding tasks. It is crucial for rule-based problem solving, actively maintaining and manipulating information in working memory and making decisions in the context of goal-directed behaviour. Efficient processing in the frontoparietal network during cognitive control tasks enables the fulfillment of cognitive demands. Based on current cognitive demands, the FPN flexibly divides into two subsystems that connect to other networks: the default mode network for introspective processes and the dorsal attention network for perceptual attention.

== Clinical significance ==
Disruption of the nodes of the FPN has been found in virtually every psychiatric and neurological disorder, from autism, schizophrenia and depression to frontotemporal dementia and Alzheimer's disease.

== Nomenclature ==
The term central executive network (CEN) is generally equivalent to the frontoparietal network in literature, distinguishing it from the dorsal attention network (DAN), with which it has several similarities, though sometimes it has been used to include the DAN.

The FPN has fewer similarities with the salience network (which has also been equated with the cingulo-opercular network or ventral attention network). Regardless, it has sometimes been grouped together with either the DAN or the salience network (usually the latter) under the name executive control network (ECN). The term frontoparietal control network (FPCN) has also been used, generally also for a grouping of the FPN and the salience network.

Other names for the FPN have included the multiple-demand system, extrinsic mode network, domain-general system and cognitive control network.

In 2019, Uddin et al. proposed that lateral frontoparietal network (L-FPN) be used as the standard name for this network.

== See also ==
- Default mode network
- Salience network
