= Salience network =

Large-scale brain network involved in detecting and attending to relevant stimuli

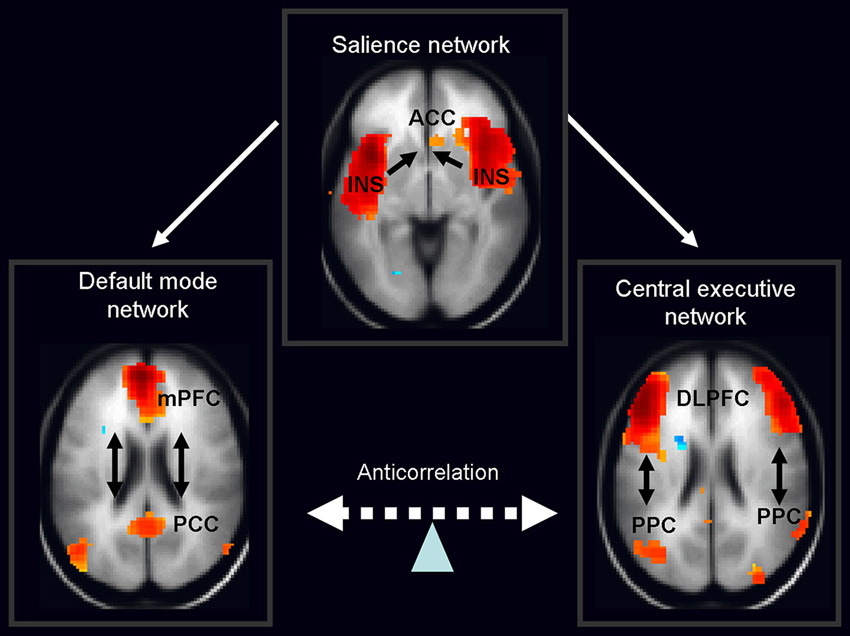
The salience network is theorized to mediate switching between the default mode network and central executive network.

The salience network (SN), also referred to as the midcingulo-insular network (M-CIN) or cingulo-opercular network in anatomical parcellation schemes, is a large scale network of the human brain that is primarily composed of the anterior insula (AI) and dorsal anterior cingulate cortex (dACC). It is involved in detecting and filtering salient stimuli, as well as in recruiting relevant functional networks. Together with its interconnected brain networks, the SN contributes to a variety of complex functions, including communication, social behavior, and self-awareness through the integration of sensory, emotional, and cognitive information.

The network is detectable through independent component analysis of resting state fMRI images, as well as seed based functional connectivity analysis. The functional connectivity has been linked with structural connectivity through diffusion tensor imaging, which reveals white matter tracts between the AI and dACC.

== Anatomy ==
The salience network is primarily anchored at the anterior insula (AI) and dorsal anterior cingulate cortex (dACC). The node in the AI corresponds with the dorsal-anterior division distinguished in meta-analyses of task-positive network related neuroimaging studies. The AI and dACC are linked via a white matter tract along the uncinate fasciculus. Other regions of the network may include the inferior parietal cortex, right temporoparietal junction, and lateral prefrontal cortex.

The subcortical nodes have yet to be structurally linked to the AI and dACC, however both seed-based and resting-state studies have observed intrinsic connectivity of the cortical nodes, with subcortical nodes consisting of the sublenticular extended amygdala, the putamen, the ventral striatum, the dorsomedial thalamus, hypothalamus, and the substantia nigra/ventral tegmental area. The salience network is also distinguished by distinct cellular components, including von Economo neurons in the AI/dACC. Cortico-striatal-thalamic loop circuits contribute to the salience network.

== Function ==
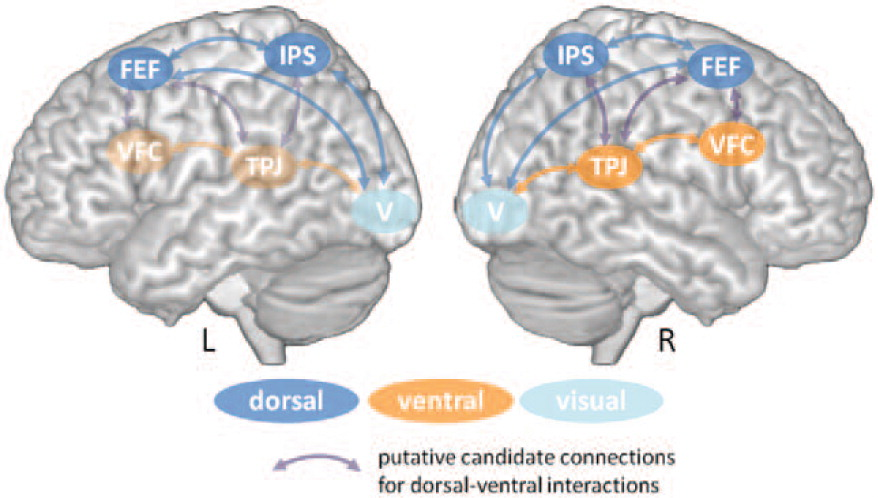
Interaction between the ventral (salience) and dorsal attention networks enables dynamic control of attention in relation to top-down goals and bottom-up sensory stimulation.

While the function of the salience network is not exactly known, it has been implicated in the detection and integration of emotional and sensory stimuli, as well as in modulating the switch between the internally directed cognition of the default mode network and the externally directed cognition of the central executive network. Evidence that the salience network mediates a switch between the DMN and CEN comes from Granger causality analysis and studies utilizing transcranial magnetic stimulation. The timing of electrophysiological responses during the oddball task is consistent with interaction, as after the initial mismatch negativity response is transmitted "bottom-up" from sensory regions, a "top-down" signal localized to the AI and dACC occurs before a widespread evoked potential that corresponds to attentional shifting. It has also been hypothesized that the AI receives multimodal sensory input and the ACC and the associated dorsomedial prefrontal cortex sends motor output.

== Clinical significance ==
Abnormalities in the salience network have been observed in various psychiatric disorders, including depression, anxiety disorders, post-traumatic stress disorder, schizophrenia, frontotemporal dementia, dementia with Lewy bodies (DLB), and Alzheimer's disease.

- The frontostriatal salience network is expanded nearly twofold in the cortex of most individuals with depression.
- The AI node of the salience network has been observed to be hyperactive in anxiety disorders, which is thought to reflect predictions of aversive bodily states leading to worrisome thoughts and anxious behaviors. In schizophrenia, both structural and functional abnormalities have been observed, thought to reflect excessive salience being ascribed to internally generated stimuli.
- In individuals with autism, the relative salience of social stimuli, such as face, eyes, and gaze, may be diminished, leading to poor social skills.
- A study of 79 DLB patients in prodromal to mild stages reported reduced connectivity within the SN. Fluctuations in DLB patients appeared to be related to a disturbed external functional connectivity of the SN, which may lead to less relevant transitions between different cognitive states in response to internal and environmental stimuli.

== Nomenclature ==
The cingulo-opercular network (CO) has generally been equated with the salience network, but it may represent a distinct but adjacent network or a part of the SN. The CO may involve more dorsal areas, while the SN involves more ventral and rostral areas of the anterior insula and medial frontal cortex containing von Economo neurons. The CO is sometimes also referred to as the cingulo-insular network.

=== Ventral attention network ===
The ventral attention network (VAN), also known as the ventral frontoparietal network (VFN) or ventral attention system (VAS), has also been equated with the SN. The VAN is commonly defined as a right-hemisphere-dominant network involving the temporoparietal junction and the ventral frontal cortex that responds to unexpected salient stimuli. Some have defined it as a larger, bilateral network that is a combination of the SN and CO, while others have described it as a part of the salience network involving the more dorsal anterior insular cortex.

In 2019, Uddin et al. proposed that midcingulo-insular network (M-CIN) be used as a standard anatomical name for the network that includes the SN, CO, and VAN.

== See also ==
- Default mode network
- Frontoparietal network
- Bottom-up processing
