= Dorsal attention network =

Large-scale brain network involved in voluntary orienting of attention

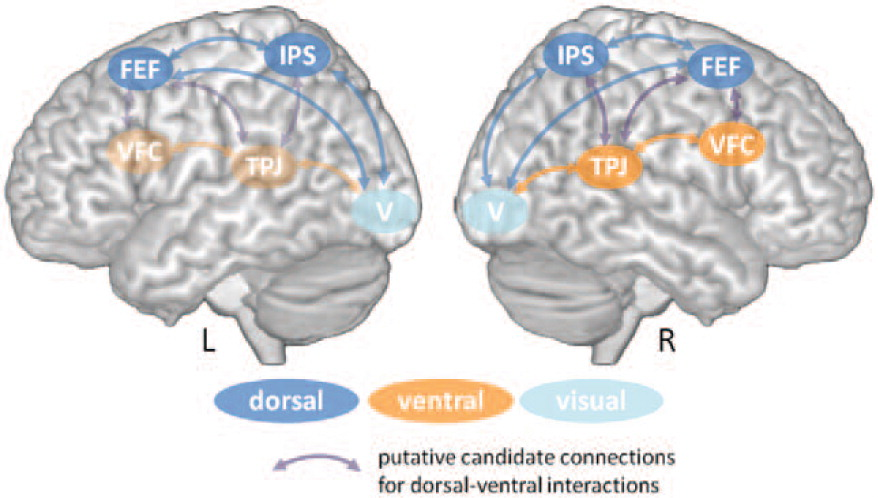
Interaction between dorsal and ventral attention networks enables dynamic control of attention in relation to top-down goals and bottom-up sensory stimulation.

The dorsal attention network (DAN), also known anatomically as the dorsal frontoparietal network (D-FPN), is a large-scale brain network of the human brain that is primarily composed of the intraparietal sulcus (IPS) and frontal eye fields (FEF). It is named and most known for its role in voluntary orienting of visuospatial attention.

As the IPS and FEF were noticed to be activated during many attention-demanding tasks, this network was sometimes referred to as the task-positive network to contrast it against the task-negative network, or default mode network. However, this dichotomy is now considered misleading, because the default mode network can be active in certain cognitive tasks.

== Anatomy ==
The core regions of the DAN are the IPS and FEF of each hemisphere. Other regions of the network may include the middle temporal region (MT+), superior parietal lobule (SPL), supplementary eye field (SEF), and ventral premotor cortex.

More recent works indicate that the cerebellum may participate in this network as well. Less studied regions include the right dorsolateral prefrontal cortex and superior colliculus.

== Function ==
The DAN is most prominently involved in goal-directed, voluntary control of visuospatial attention. Corbetta et al., who first defined and named the DAN in the early-to-mid 2000s, suggest that the network is involved in general top-down selection of stimuli and responses, including other modalities (e.g. auditory, tactile). However, evidence that the full DAN is involved in auditory top-down attention has been questioned, as tests that make said claims incorporated both auditory and visual stimuli.

The dorsal attention network dynamically interacts with the ventral attention network (or salience network) according to task demands. The inferior frontal junction configures this interaction between the two networks during task switches or attention shifts.

== Clinical significance ==
Reduced connectivity within the dorsal and ventral attention networks has been linked to higher levels of attention deficit hyperactivity disorder symptoms. Similarly, reduced connectivity between the DAN and the frontoparietal network is associated with major depressive disorder. On the other hand, overactivation of the DAN has been observed in patients with schizophrenia.

== Nomenclature ==
There are several variations of this network's name in neuroscience literature, such as the dorsal attention system, dorsal frontoparietal attention network, and frontoparietal attention network. Until the discovery of other networks, such as the frontoparietal control network, the term task-positive network referred to the DAN. The term task-positive networks is still sometimes used to refer to all non-default-mode networks.

In 2019, Uddin et al. proposed that dorsal frontoparietal network (D-FPN) be used as a standard anatomical name for this network.
