= Large-scale brain network =

Collections of brain regions working together

Large-scale brain networks (also known as intrinsic brain networks) are collections of widespread brain regions showing functional connectivity by statistical analysis of the fMRI BOLD signal or other recording methods such as EEG, PET and MEG. An emerging paradigm in neuroscience is that cognitive tasks are performed not by individual brain regions working in isolation but by networks consisting of several discrete brain regions that are said to be "functionally connected". Functional connectivity networks may be found using algorithms such as cluster analysis, spatial independent component analysis (ICA), seed based, and others. Synchronized brain regions may also be identified using long-range synchronization of the EEG, MEG, or other dynamic brain signals.

The set of identified brain areas that are linked together in a large-scale network varies with cognitive function. When the cognitive state is not explicit (i.e., the subject is at "rest"), the large-scale brain network is a resting state network (RSN). As a physical system with graph-like properties, a large-scale brain network has both nodes and edges and cannot be identified simply by the co-activation of brain areas. In recent decades, the analysis of brain networks was made feasible by advances in imaging techniques as well as new tools from graph theory and dynamical systems.

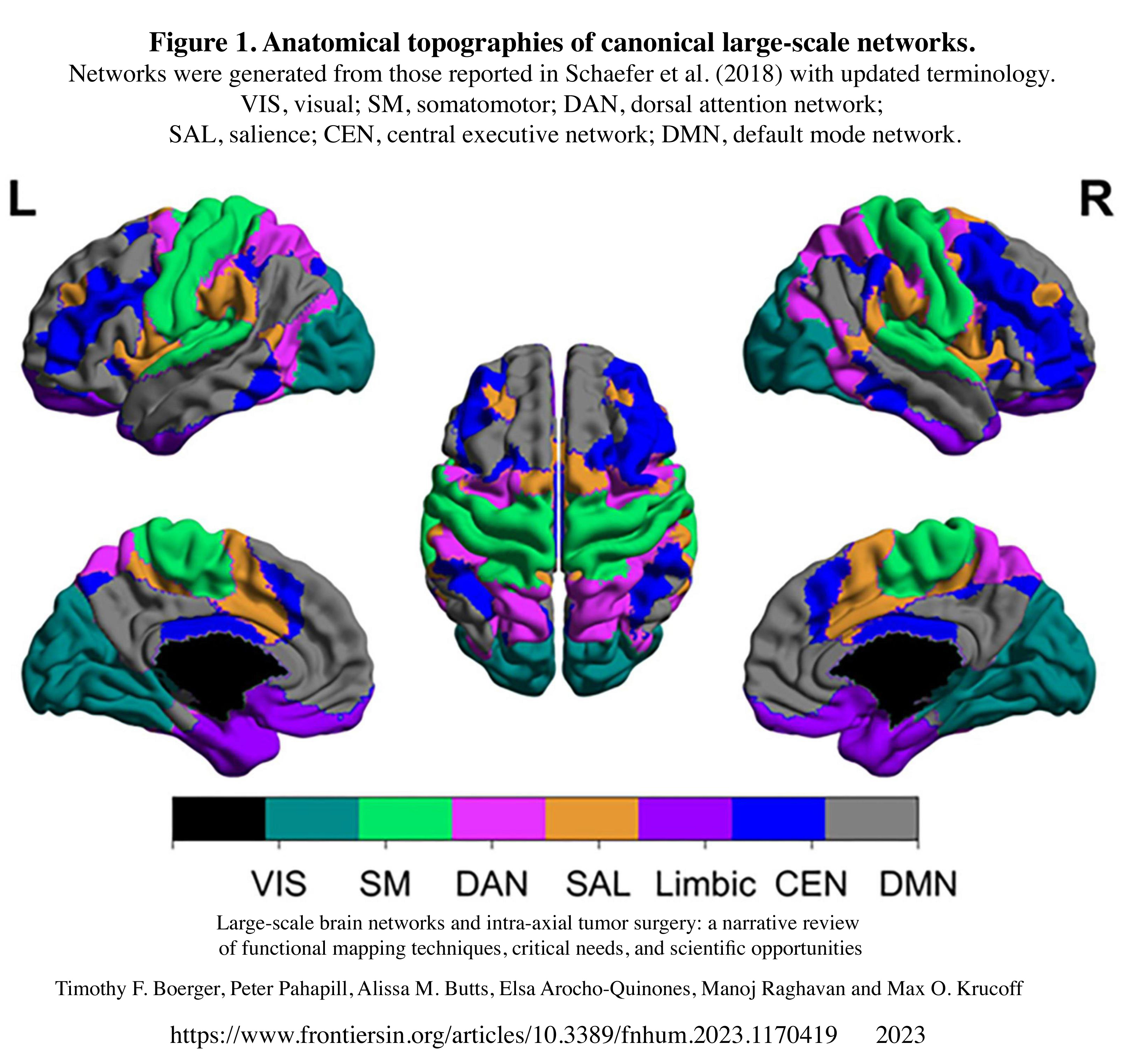
Anatomical topographies of canonical large-scale networks

The Organization for Human Brain Mapping has created the Workgroup for HArmonized Taxonomy of NETworks (WHATNET) group to work towards a consensus regarding network nomenclature. WHATNET conducted a survey in 2021 which showed a large degree of agreement about the name and topography of three networks: the "somato network", the "default network" and the "visual network", while other networks had less agreement. Several issues make the work of creating a common atlas for networks difficult: some of these issues are the variability of spatial and time scales, variability across individuals, and the dynamic nature of some networks.

Some large-scale brain networks are identified by their function and provide a coherent framework for understanding cognition by offering a neural model of how different cognitive functions emerge when different sets of brain regions join together as self-organized coalitions. The number and composition of the coalitions will vary with the algorithm and parameters used to identify them. In one model, there is only the default mode network and the task-positive network, but most current analyses show several networks, from a small handful to 17. The most common and stable networks are enumerated below. The regions participating in a functional network may be dynamically reconfigured.

Disruptions in activity in various networks have been implicated in neuropsychiatric disorders such as depression, Alzheimer's, autism spectrum disorder, schizophrenia, ADHD and bipolar disorder.

== Commonly identified networks ==
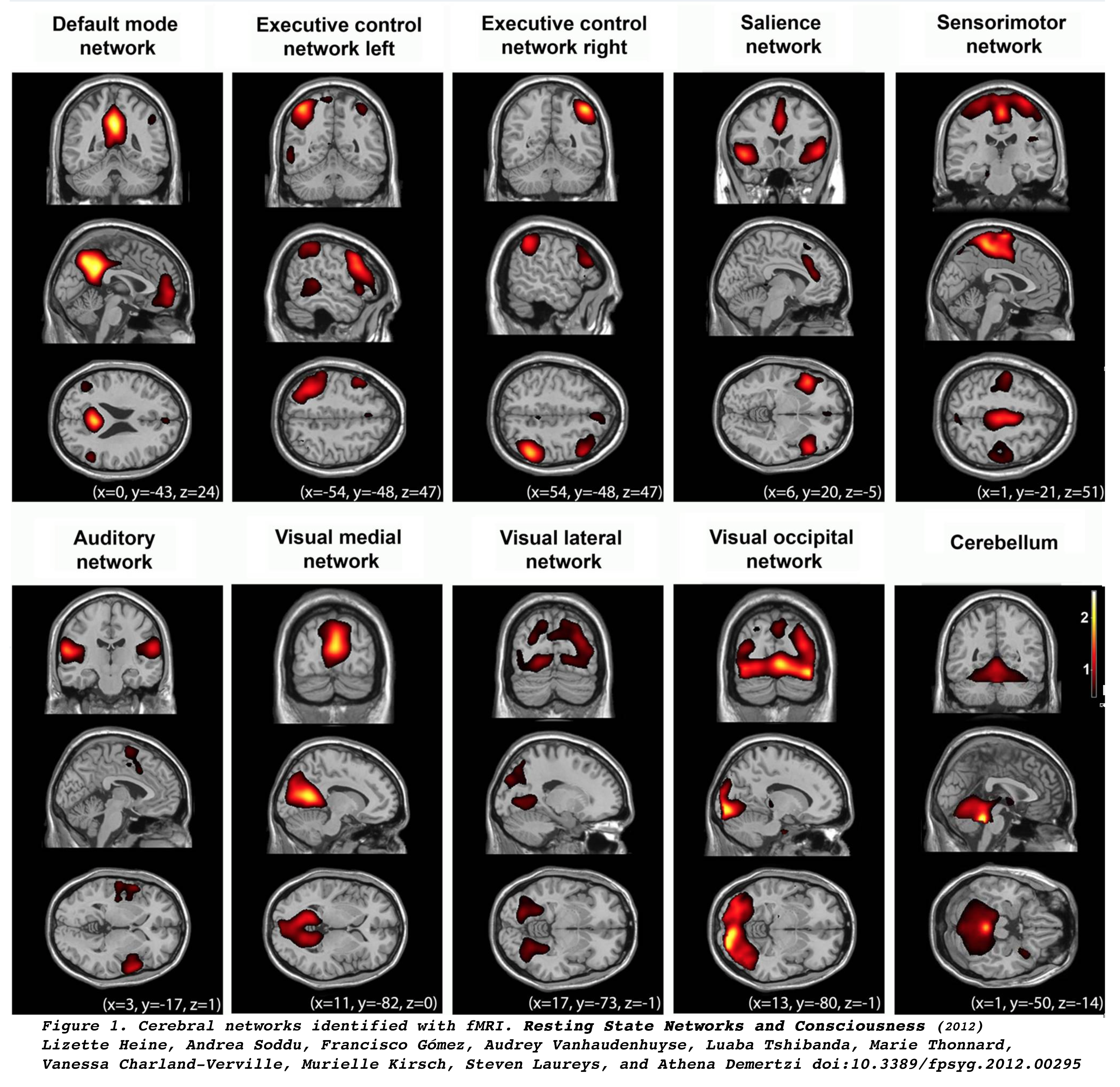
An example that identified 10 large-scale brain networks from resting state fMRI activity through independent component analysis

Because brain networks can be identified at various different resolutions and with various different neurobiological properties, there is currently no universal atlas of brain networks that fits all circumstances. Uddin, Yeo, and Spreng proposed in 2019 that the following six networks should be defined as core networks based on converging evidences from multiple studies to facilitate communication between researchers.

=== Default mode (medial frontoparietal) ===
- The default mode network is active when an individual is awake and at rest. It preferentially activates when individuals focus on internally-oriented tasks such as daydreaming, envisioning the future, retrieving memories, and theory of mind. It is negatively correlated with brain systems that focus on external visual signals. It is the most widely researched network.

=== Salience (midcingulo-insular) ===
- The salience network consists of several structures, including the anterior (bilateral) insula, dorsal anterior cingulate cortex, and three subcortical structures which are the ventral striatum, substantia nigra/ventral tegmental region. It plays the key role of monitoring the salience of external inputs and internal brain events. Specifically, it aids in directing attention by identifying important biological and cognitive events.
- This network includes the ventral attention network, which primarily includes the temporoparietal junction and the ventral frontal cortex of the right hemisphere. These areas respond when behaviorally relevant stimuli occur unexpectedly. The ventral attention network is inhibited during focused attention in which top-down processing is being used, such as when visually searching for something. This response may prevent goal-driven attention from being distracted by non-relevant stimuli. It becomes active again when the target or relevant information about the target is found.

=== Attention (dorsal frontoparietal) ===
- This network is involved in the voluntary, top-down deployment of attention. Within the dorsal attention network, the intraparietal sulcus and frontal eye fields influence the visual areas of the brain. These influencing factors allow for the orientation of attention.

=== Central Executive (lateral frontoparietal) ===
- This network initiates and modulates cognitive control and comprises 18 sub-regions of the brain. There is a strong correlation between fluid intelligence and the involvement of the fronto-parietal network with other networks.
- Versions of this network have also been called the executive control network and the cognitive control network.

=== Sensorimotor or somatomotor (pericentral) ===
- This network processes somatosensory information and coordinates motion. The auditory cortex may be included.

=== Visual (occipital) ===
- This network handles visual information processing.

== Other networks ==
Different methods and data have identified several other brain networks, many of which greatly overlap or are subsets of more well-characterized core networks.

- Limbic
- Auditory
- Right/left executive
- Cerebellar
- Spatial attention
- Language
- Lateral visual
- Temporal
- Visual perception/imagery

== See also ==
- Complex network
- Neural network (biology)
