= Default mode network =

Large-scale brain network active when not focusing on an external task

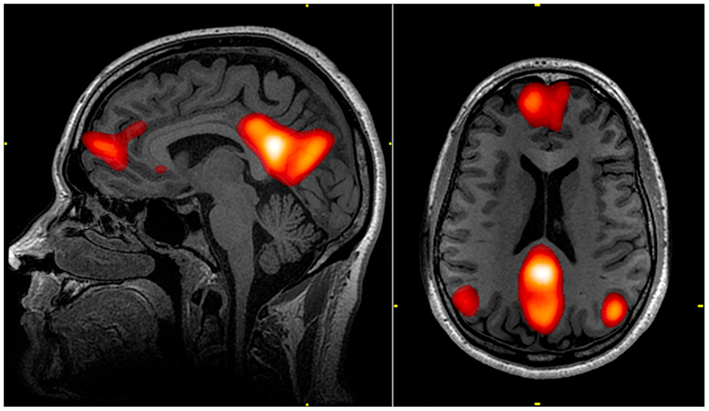
- fMRI scan showing regions of the default mode network; the dorsal medial prefrontal cortex, the posterior cingulate cortex, the precuneus, and the angular gyrus

Identifiers
- MeSH: D000082702

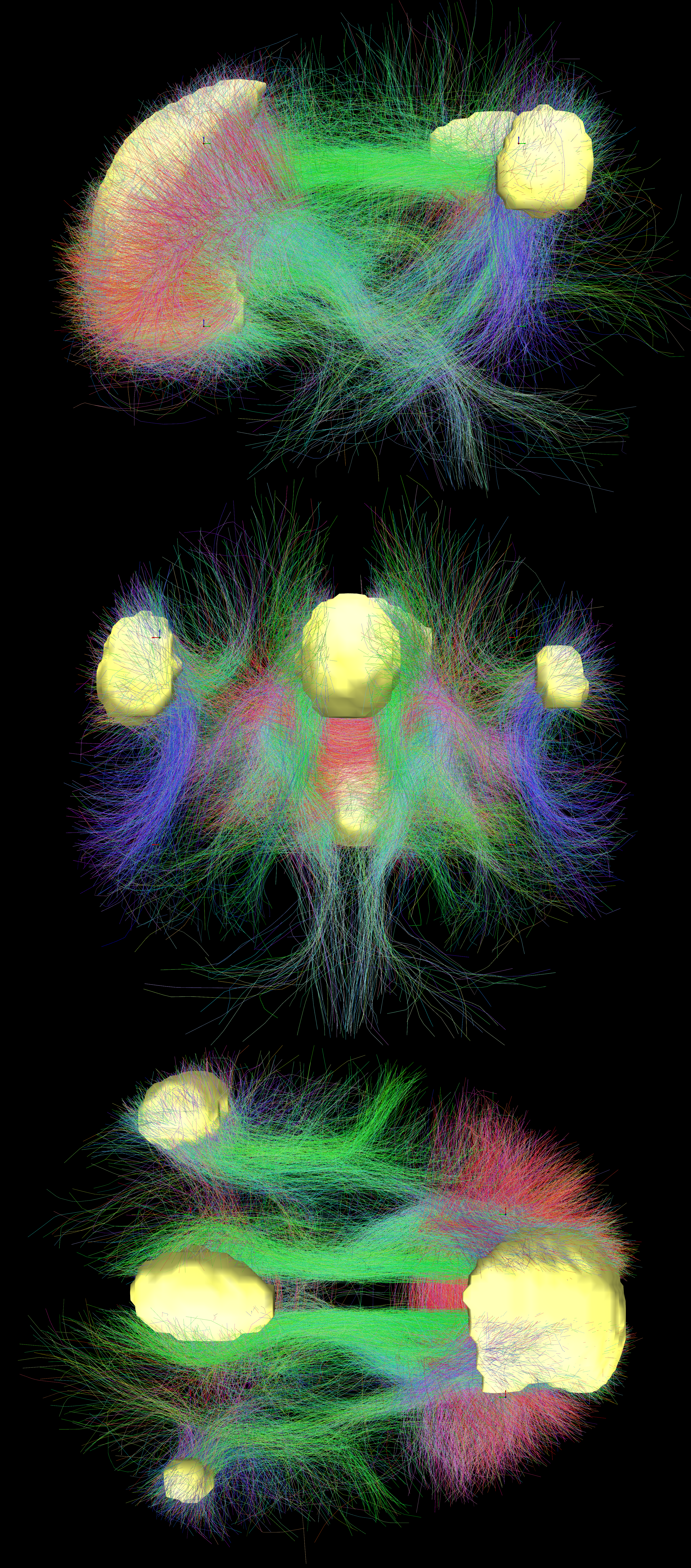
Default mode network connectivity. This image shows main regions of the default mode network (yellow) and connectivity between the regions color-coded by structural traversing direction (xyz → rgb).

In neuroscience, the default mode network (DMN), also known as the default network, default state network, or anatomically the medial frontoparietal network (M-FPN), is a large-scale brain network primarily composed of the medial prefrontal cortex, posterior cingulate cortex, precuneus and angular gyrus. It is best known for being active when a person is not focused on the outside world and the brain is at wakeful rest, such as during daydreaming and mind-wandering. It can also be active during detailed thoughts related to external task performance. Other times that the DMN is active include when the individual is thinking about others, thinking about themselves, remembering the past, and planning for the future. The DMN creates a coherent "internal narrative" central to the construction of a sense of self.

The DMN was originally noticed to be deactivated in certain goal-oriented tasks and was sometimes referred to as the task-negative network, in contrast with the task-positive network. This nomenclature is now widely considered misleading, because the network can be active in internal goal-oriented and conceptual cognitive tasks. The DMN has been shown to be negatively correlated with other networks in the brain such as attention networks.

Evidence has pointed to disruptions in the DMN of people with Alzheimer's disease and autism spectrum disorder. Psilocybin produces the largest changes in areas of the DMN associated with neuropsychiatric disorders.

== History ==
Hans Berger, the inventor of the electroencephalogram, was the first to propose the idea that the brain is constantly busy. In a series of papers published in 1929, he showed that the electrical oscillations detected by his device do not cease even when the subject is at rest. However, his ideas were not taken seriously, and a general perception formed among neurologists that only when a focused activity is performed does the brain (or a part of the brain) become active.

But in the 1950s, Louis Sokoloff and his colleagues noticed that metabolism in the brain stayed the same when a person went from a resting state to performing effortful math problems, suggesting active metabolism in the brain must also be happening during rest. In the 1970s, David H. Ingvar and colleagues observed blood flow in the front part of the brain became the highest when a person is at rest. Around the same time, intrinsic oscillatory behavior in vertebrate neurons was observed in cerebellar Purkinje cells, inferior olivary nucleus and thalamus.

In the 1990s, with the advent of positron emission tomography (PET) scans, researchers began to notice that when a person is involved in perception, language, and attention tasks, the same brain areas become less active compared to passive rest, and labeled these areas as becoming "deactivated".

In 1995, Bharat Biswal, a graduate student at the Medical College of Wisconsin in Milwaukee, discovered that the human sensorimotor system displayed "resting-state connectivity," exhibiting synchronicity in functional magnetic resonance imaging (fMRI) scans while not engaged in any task.

Later, experiments by neurologist Marcus E. Raichle's lab at Washington University School of Medicine and other groups showed that the brain's energy consumption is increased by less than 5% of its baseline energy consumption while performing a focused mental task. These experiments showed that the brain is constantly active with a high level of activity even when the person is not engaged in focused mental work. Research thereafter focused on finding the regions responsible for this constant background activity level.

Raichle coined the term "default mode" in 2001 to describe resting state brain function; the concept rapidly became a central theme in neuroscience. Around this time the idea was developed that this network of brain areas is involved in internally directed thoughts and is suspended during specific goal-directed behaviors. In 2003, Greicius and colleagues examined resting state fMRI scans and looked at how correlated different sections in the brain are to each other. Their correlation maps highlighted the same areas already identified by the other researchers. This was important because it demonstrated a convergence of methods all leading to the same areas being involved in the DMN. Since then other networks have been identified, such as visual, auditory, and attention networks. Some of them are often anti-correlated with the default mode network.

Until the mid-2000s, researchers labeled the default mode network as the "task-negative network" because it was deactivated when participants had to perform external goal-directed tasks. DMN was thought to only be active during passive rest and inactive during tasks. However, more recent studies have demonstrated the DMN to be active in certain internal goal-directed tasks such as social working memory and autobiographical tasks.

Around 2007, the number of papers referencing the default mode network skyrocketed. In all years prior to 2007, there were 12 papers published that referenced "default mode network" or "default network" in the title; however, between 2007 and 2014 the number increased to 1,384 papers. One reason for the increase in papers was the robust effect of finding the DMN with resting-state scans and independent component analysis (ICA). Another reason was that the DMN could be measured with short and effortless resting-state scans, meaning they could be performed on any population including young children, clinical populations, and nonhuman primates. A third reason was that the role of the DMN was now understood to be more than just a passive brain network.

== Anatomy ==
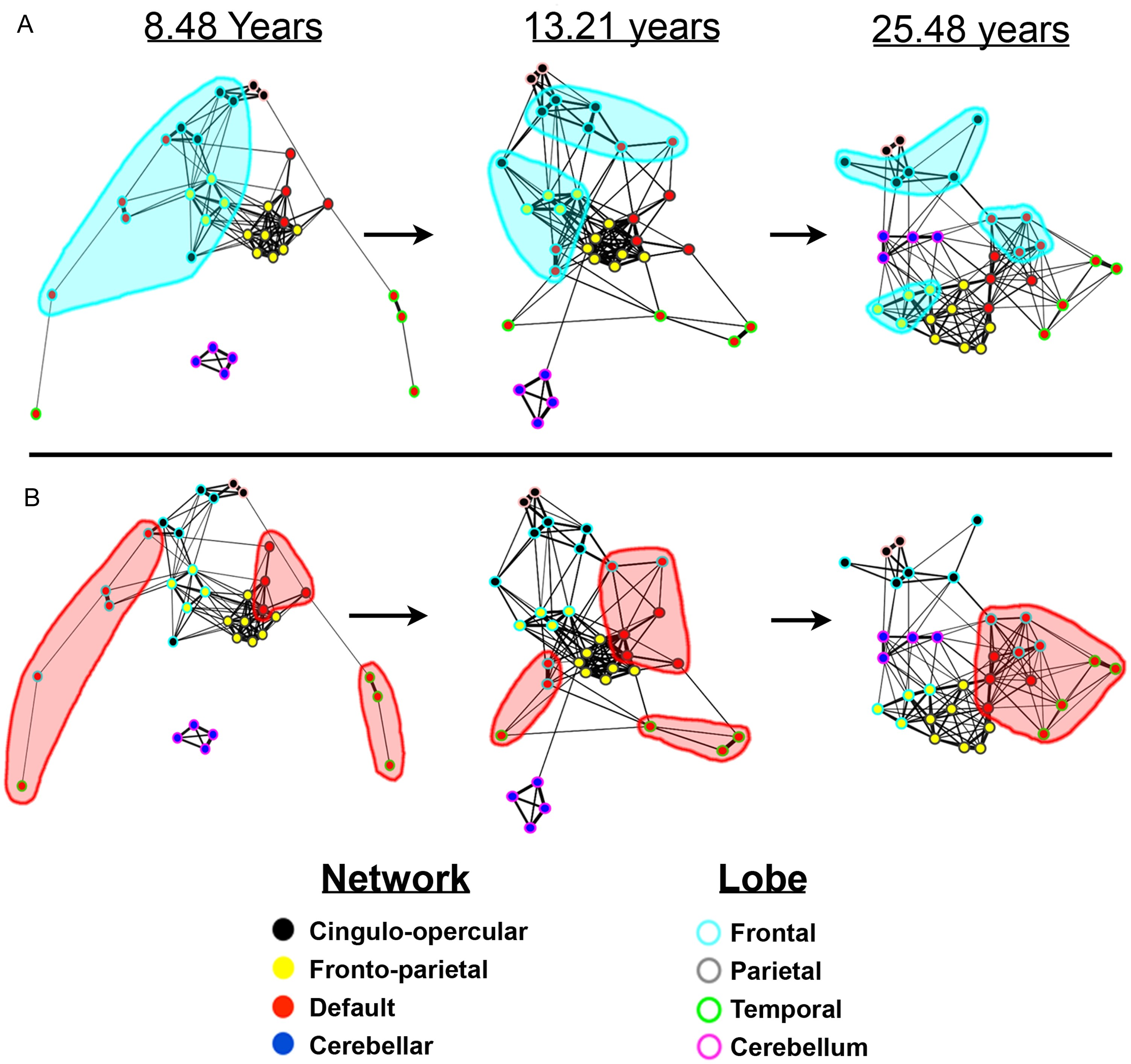
Graphs of the dynamic development of correlations between brain networks. (A) In children the regions are largely local and are organized by their physical location; the frontal regions are highlighted in light blue. (B) In adults the networks become highly correlated despite their physical distance; the default network is highlighted in light red. This result is now believed to have been confounded by artifactual processes attributable to the tendency of younger subjects to move more during image acquisition, which preferentially inflates estimates of connectivity between physically proximal regions (Power 2012, Satterthwaite 2012).

The default mode network is an interconnected and anatomically defined set of brain regions. The network can be separated into hubs and subsections:

Functional hubs: Information regarding the self

- Posterior cingulate cortex (PCC) & precuneus: Combines bottom-up (not controlled) attention with information from memory and perception. The ventral (lower) part of the PCC activates in all tasks which involve the DMN including those related to the self, related to others, remembering the past, thinking about the future, and processing concepts plus spatial navigation. The dorsal (upper) part of PCC involves involuntary awareness and arousal. The precuneus is involved in visual, sensorimotor, and attentional information.
- Medial prefrontal cortex (mPFC): Decisions about self-processing such as personal information, autobiographical memories, future goals and events, and decision making regarding those personally very close such as family. The ventral (lower) part is involved in positive emotional information and internally valued reward.
- Angular gyrus: Connects perception, attention, spatial cognition, and action and helps with parts of recall of episodic memories.

Dorsal medial subsystem: Thinking about others

- Functional hubs: PCC, mPFC, and angular gyrus
- Dorsal medial prefrontal cortex (dmPFC): Involved in social directed thought such as determining or inferring the purpose of others' actions
- Temporoparietal junction (TPJ): Reflects on beliefs about others, also known as theory of mind
- Lateral temporal cortex: Retrieval of social semantic and conceptual knowledge
- Anterior temporal pole: Abstract conceptual information particularly social in nature

Medial temporal subsystem: Autobiographical memory and future simulations

- Functional hubs: PCC, mPFC, and angular gyrus
- Hippocampus (HF+): Formation of new memories as well as remembering the past and imagining the future
- Parahippocampus (PHC): Spatial and scene recognition and simulation
- Retrosplenial cortex (RSC): Spatial navigation
- Posterior inferior parietal lobe (pIPL): Junction of auditory, visual, and somatosensory information and attention

The default mode network is most commonly defined with resting state data by putting a seed in the posterior cingulate cortex and examining which other brain areas most correlate with this area. The DMN can also be defined by the areas deactivated during external directed tasks compared to rest. Independent component analysis (ICA) robustly finds the DMN for individuals and across groups, and has become the standard tool for mapping the default network.

It has been shown that the default mode network exhibits the highest overlap in its structural and functional connectivity, which suggests that the structural architecture of the brain may be built in such a way that this particular network is activated by default. Recent evidence from a population brain-imaging study of 10,000 UK Biobank participants further suggests that each DMN node can be decomposed into subregions with complementary structural and functional properties. It has been a widespread practice in DMN research to treat its constituent nodes to be functionally homogeneous, but the distinction between subnodes within each major DMN node has mostly been neglected. However, the close proximity of subnodes that propagate hippocampal space-time outputs and subnodes that describe the global network architecture may enable default functions, such as autobiographical recall or internally-orientated thinking.

In the infant's brain, there is limited evidence of the default network, but default network connectivity is more consistent in children aged 9–12 years, suggesting that the default network undergoes developmental change.

Functional connectivity analysis in monkeys shows a similar network of regions to the default mode network seen in humans. The PCC is also a key hub in monkeys; however, the mPFC is smaller and less well connected to other brain regions, largely because human's mPFC is much larger and well developed.

Diffusion MRI imaging shows white matter tracts connecting different areas of the DMN together. The structural connections found from diffusion MRI imaging and the functional correlations from resting state fMRI show the highest level of overlap and agreement within the DMN areas. This provides evidence that neurons in the DMN regions are linked to each other through large tracts of axons and this causes activity in these areas to be correlated with one another. From the point of view of effective connectivity, many studies have attempted to shed some light using dynamic causal modeling, with inconsistent results. However, directionality from the medial prefrontal cortex towards the posterior cingulate gyrus seems confirmed in multiple studies, and the inconsistent results appear to be related to small sample size analysis.

== Function ==
The default mode network is thought to be involved in several different functions:

It is potentially the neurological basis for the self:

- Autobiographical information: Memories of collection of events and facts about one's self
- Self-reference: Referring to traits and descriptions of one's self
- Emotion of one's self: Reflecting about one's own emotional state

Thinking about others:

- Theory of mind: Thinking about the thoughts of others and what they might or might not know
- Emotions of others: Understanding the emotions of other people and empathizing with their feelings
- Moral reasoning: Determining a just and an unjust result of an action
- Social evaluations: Good-bad attitude judgements about social concepts
- Social categories: Reflecting on important social characteristics and status of a group
- Social isolation: A perceived lack of social interaction

Remembering the past and thinking about the future:

- Remembering the past: Recalling events that happened in the past
- Imagining the future: Envisioning events that might happen in the future
- Episodic memory: Detailed memory related to specific events in time
- Story comprehension: Understanding and remembering a narrative
- Replay: Consolidating recently acquired memory traces

The default mode network is active during passive rest and mind-wandering which usually involves thinking about others, thinking about one's self, remembering the past, and envisioning the future rather than the task being performed. Recent work, however, has challenged a specific mapping between the default mode network and mind-wandering, given that the system is important in maintaining detailed representations of task information during working memory encoding. Electrocorticography studies (which involve placing electrodes on the surface of a subject's cerebral cortex) have shown the default mode network becomes activated within a fraction of a second after participants finish a task. Additionally, during attention demanding tasks, sufficient deactivation of the default mode network at the time of memory encoding has been shown to result in more successful long-term memory consolidation.

Studies have shown that when people watch a movie, listen to a story, or read a story, their DMNs are highly correlated with each other. DMNs are not correlated if the stories are scrambled or are in a language the person does not understand, suggesting that the network is highly involved in the comprehension and the subsequent memory formation of that story. The DMN is shown to even be correlated if the same story is presented to different people in different languages, further suggesting the DMN is truly involved in the comprehension aspect of the story and not the auditory or language aspect.

The default mode network is deactivated during some external goal-oriented tasks such as visual attention or cognitive working memory tasks. However, with internal goal-oriented tasks, such as social working memory or autobiographical tasks, the DMN is positively activated with the task and correlates with other networks such as the network involved in executive function. Regions of the DMN are also activated during cognitively demanding tasks that require higher-order conceptual representations. The DMN shows higher activation when behavioral responses are stable, and this activation is independent of self-reported mind wandering. Meditation, which involves focusing the mind on breathing and relaxation, is associated with reduced activity of the DMN.

Starr et al. (2019) suggests that the DMN is related to the perception of beauty, in which the network becomes activated in a generalized way to aesthetically moving domains such as artworks, landscapes, and architecture. This would explain a deep inner feeling of pleasure related to aesthetics, interconnected with the sense of personal identity, due to the network functions related to the self.

== Clinical significance ==
The default mode network has been hypothesized to be relevant to disorders including Alzheimer's disease, autism, schizophrenia, major depressive disorder (MDD), chronic pain, post-traumatic stress disorder (PTSD) and others. In particular, the DMN has also been reported to show overlapping yet distinct neural activity patterns across different neurodevelopmental conditions, such as when directly comparing attention deficit hyperactivity disorder (ADHD) and autism.

People with Alzheimer's disease show a reduction in glucose (energy use) within the areas of the default mode network. These reductions start off as slight decreases in patients with mild symptoms and continue to large reductions in those with severe symptoms. Surprisingly, amyloid-beta plaque (one of the major hallmarks of Alzheimer's disease) builds up in the DMN even before individuals show symptoms of Alzheimer's disease. This prompted Randy Buckner and colleagues to propose the high metabolic rate from continuous activation of DMN causes more amyloid-beta peptide to accumulate in these DMN areas and to form amyloid-beta plaque. This disrupts the DMN and because the DMN is heavily involved in memory formation and retrieval, this disruption leads to the symptoms of Alzheimer's disease.

DMN is thought to be different in Autistic individuals. These individuals are impaired in social interaction and communication which are tasks central to this network. Studies have shown differences in connections between areas of the DMN in Autistic individuals, especially between the mPFC (involved in thinking about the self and others) and the PCC (the central core of the DMN). The more severe the autism (or the higher the support needs if using a neuroaffirming lens), the less connected these areas are to each other. It is not clear if this is a cause or a result of autism, or if a third factor is causing both (confounding).

Although it is not clear whether the DMN connectivity is increased or decreased in psychotic bipolar disorder and schizophrenia, several genes correlated with altered DMN connectivity are also risk genes for mood and psychosis disorders.

Rumination, one of the main symptoms of major depressive disorder, is associated with increased DMN connectivity and dominance over other networks during rest. Such DMN hyperconnectivity has been observed in first-episode depression and chronic pain. Altered DMN connectivity may change the way a person perceives events and their social and moral reasoning, thus increasing their susceptibility to depressive symptoms.

Lower connectivity between brain regions was found across the default network in people who have experienced long-term trauma, such as childhood abuse or neglect, and is associated with dysfunctional attachment patterns. Among people experiencing PTSD, lower activation was found in the posterior cingulate gyrus compared to controls, and severe PTSD was characterized by lower connectivity within the DMN.

Adults and children with ADHD show reduced anticorrelation between the DMN and other brain networks. The cause may be a lag in brain maturation. More generally, competing activation between the DMN and other networks during memory encoding may result in poor long-term memory consolidation, which is a symptom of not only ADHD but also depression, anxiety, autism, and schizophrenia. This raises the question of whether this difference is related to neurodivergence, or the impact of living in an unaccommodating world.

== Modulation ==
The default mode network (DMN) may be modulated by the following interventions and processes:

- Acupuncture – Deactivation of the limbic brain areas and the DMN. It has been suggested that this is due to the pain response.
- Antidepressants – High levels of DMN connectivity are impaired following treatment with antidepressant medications in PTSD.
- Attention Training Technique - Research shows that even a single session of Attention Training Technique changes functional connectivity of the DMN.
- Deep brain stimulation – Alterations in brain activity with deep brain stimulation may be used to balance resting state networks.
- Meditation – Structural changes in areas of the DMN such as the temporoparietal junction, posterior cingulate cortex, and precuneus have been found in meditation practitioners. There is reduced activation and reduced functional connectivity of the DMN in long-term practitioners. Various forms of nondirective meditation, including Transcendental Meditation and Acem Meditation, have been found to activate the DMN.
- Physical Activity and Exercise – Physical Activity, and more likely Aerobic Training, may alter the DMN. In addition, sports experts are showing networks differences, notably of the DMN.
- Psychedelic drugs – Reduced blood flow to the PCC and mPFC was observed under the administration of psilocybin. These two areas are considered to be the main nodes of the DMN. One study on the effects of LSD demonstrated that the drug desynchronizes brain activity within the DMN; the activity of the brain regions that constitute the DMN becomes less correlated.
- Psychotherapy – In PTSD, the abnormalities in the default mode network normalize in individuals who respond to psychotherapy interventions.
- Sleep deprivation – Functional connectivity between nodes of the DMN in their resting-state is usually strong, but sleep deprivation results in a decrease in connectivity within the DMN. Recent studies suggest a decrease in connectivity between the DMN and the task-positive network as a result of sleep loss.
- Sleeping and resting wakefulness
  - Onset of sleep – Increase in connectivity between the DMN and the task-positive network.
  - REM sleep – Possible increase in connectivity between nodes of the DMN.
  - Resting wakefulness – Functional connectivity between nodes of the DMN is strong.
  - Stage N2 of NREM sleep – Decrease in connectivity between the posterior cingulate cortex and medial prefrontal cortex.
  - Stage N3 of NREM sleep – Further decrease in connectivity between the PCC and MPFC.

== Criticism ==
Some have argued the brain areas in the default mode network only show up together because of the vascular coupling of large arteries and veins in the brain near these areas, not because these areas are actually functionally connected to each other. Support for this argument comes from studies that show changes in breathing alters oxygen levels in the blood which in turn affects DMN the most. These studies however do not explain why the DMN can also be identified using PET scans by measuring glucose metabolism which is independent of vascular coupling and in electrocorticography studies measuring electrical activity on the surface of the brain, and in MEG by measuring magnetic fields associated with electrophysiological brain activity that bypasses the hemodynamic response.

The idea of a "default network" is not universally accepted. In 2007 the concept of the default mode was criticized as not being useful for understanding brain function, on the grounds that a simpler hypothesis is that a resting brain actually does more processing than a brain doing certain "demanding" tasks, and that there is no special significance to the intrinsic activity of the resting brain.

== Nomenclature ==
The default mode network has also been called the language network, semantic system, or limbic network. Even though the dichotomy is misleading, the term task-negative network is still sometimes used to contrast it against other more externally-oriented brain networks.

In 2019, Uddin et al. proposed that medial frontoparietal network (M-FPN) be used as a standard anatomical name for this network.

== See also ==
- Functional magnetic resonance imaging (fMRI)
- Mind-wandering
- Resting state fMRI
