= Prefrontal cortex =

Part of the brain responsible for personality, decision-making, and social behavior

- Brodmann areas, 8, 9, 10, 11, 12, 13, 14, 24, 25, 32, 44, 45, 46, and 47 are all in the prefrontal cortex

Details
- Part of: Frontal lobe
- Parts: Superior frontal gyrus Middle frontal gyrus Inferior frontal gyrus
- Artery: Anterior cerebral Middle cerebral
- Vein: Superior sagittal sinus

Identifiers
- Latin: cortex praefrontalis
- MeSH: D017397
- NeuroNames: 2429
- NeuroLex ID: nlx_anat_090801, ilx_0109209
- FMA: 224850

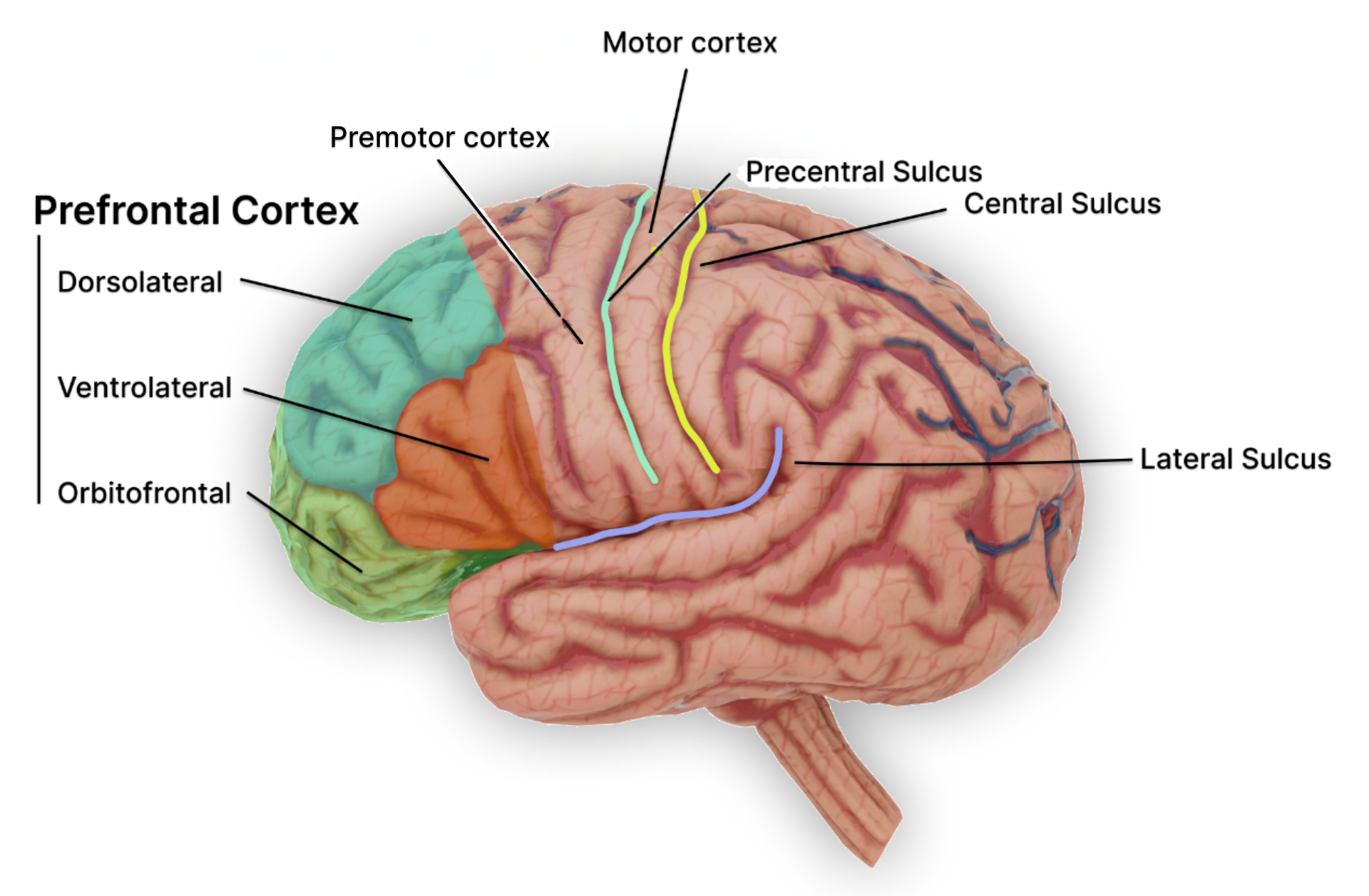
This is a diagram of the brain with the prefrontal cortex labeled.

The prefrontal cortex (PFC) is the anterior part of the cerebral cortex of each frontal lobe of the mammalian brain. It is the association cortex in the frontal lobe. This region is responsible for processing and adapting one's thinking in order to meet certain goals in different situations. These processes of thinking can include the brain allowing one to focus, control how they behave, and make decisions.

The PFC contains the Brodmann areas BA8, BA9, BA10, BA11, BA12, BA13, BA14, BA24, BA25, BA32, BA44, BA45, BA46, and BA47.

This brain region is involved in a wide range of higher-order cognitive functions, including speech formation (Broca's area), gaze (frontal eye fields), working memory (dorsolateral prefrontal cortex), and risk processing (e.g. ventromedial prefrontal cortex). The basic activity of this brain region is considered to be orchestration of thoughts and actions in accordance with internal goals. Additionally, many authors have indicated an integral link between a person's personality and the functions of the prefrontal cortex.

This brain region has been implicated in executive functions, such as planning, decision making, working memory, personality expression, moderating social behavior and controlling certain aspects of speech and language. Executive function relates to abilities to differentiate among conflicting thoughts, determine good and bad, better and best, same and different, future consequences of current activities, working toward a defined goal, prediction of outcomes, expectation based on actions, and social "control" (the ability to suppress urges that, if not suppressed, could lead to socially unacceptable outcomes).

The frontal cortex supports concrete rule learning, with more anterior regions supporting rule learning at higher levels of abstraction. The prefrontal cortex is the front part of the frontal lobe.

== Structure ==
=== Definition ===
There are three possible ways to define the prefrontal cortex:

- as the granular frontal cortex
- as the projection zone of the medial dorsal nucleus of the thalamus
- as that part of the frontal cortex whose electrical stimulation does not evoke movements

==== Granular frontal cortex ====
The prefrontal cortex has been defined based on cytoarchitectonics by the presence of a cortical granular layer IV. It is not entirely clear who first used this criterion. Many of the early cytoarchitectonic researchers restricted the use of the term prefrontal to a much smaller region of cortex including the gyrus rectus and the gyrus rostralis (Campbell, 1905; G. E. Smith, 1907; Brodmann, 1909; von Economo and Koskinas, 1925). In 1935, however, Jacobsen used the term prefrontal to distinguish granular prefrontal areas from agranular motor and premotor areas. In terms of Brodmann areas, the prefrontal cortex traditionally includes areas 8, 9, 10, 11, 12, 13, 14, 24, 25, 32, 44, 45, 46, and 47, however, not all of these areas are strictly granular – 44 is dysgranular, caudal 11 and orbital 47 are agranular. The main problem with this definition is that it works well only in primates but not in nonprimates, as the latter lack a granular layer IV. In a recent research study, scientists stimulated the amygdala area in monkeys, where they found that the auditory and prefrontal cortices got activated, which is similar to what happens in humans.

==== Projection zone ====
To define the prefrontal cortex as the projection zone of the mediodorsal nucleus of the thalamus builds on the work of Rose and Woolsey, who showed that this nucleus projects to anterior and ventral parts of the brain in nonprimates, however, Rose and Woolsey termed this projection zone "orbitofrontal." It seems to have been Akert, who, for the first time in 1964, explicitly suggested that this criterion could be used to define homologues of the prefrontal cortex in primates and nonprimates. This allowed the establishment of homologies despite the lack of a granular frontal cortex in nonprimates.

The projection zone definition is still widely accepted today (e.g. Fuster), although its usefulness has been questioned. Modern tract tracing studies have shown that projections of the mediodorsal nucleus of the thalamus are not restricted to the granular frontal cortex in primates. As a result, it was suggested to define the prefrontal cortex as the region of cortex that has stronger reciprocal connections with the mediodorsal nucleus than with any other thalamic nucleus. Uylings et al. acknowledge, however, that even with the application of this criterion, it might be rather difficult to define the prefrontal cortex unequivocally.

==== Electrically silent area of frontal cortex ====
A third definition of the prefrontal cortex is the area of frontal cortex whose electrical stimulation does not lead to observable movements. For example, in 1890, David Ferrier used the term in this sense. One complication with this definition is that the electrically "silent" frontal cortex includes both granular and non-granular areas.

=== Subdivisions ===
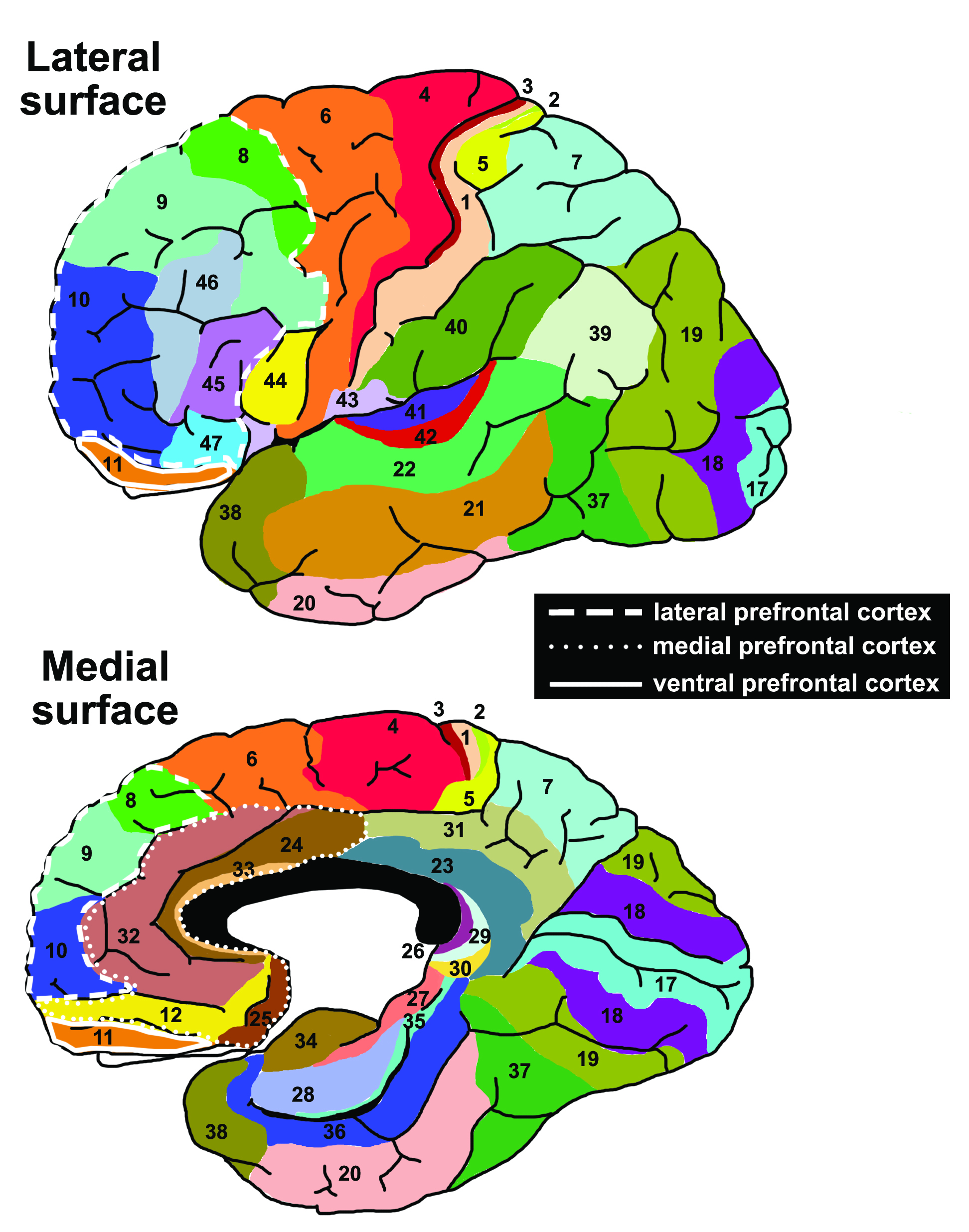

According to Striedter, the PFC of humans can be delineated into two functionally, morphologically, and evolutionarily different regions: the ventromedial PFC (vmPFC) consisting of:

1. the ventral prefrontal cortex (VPFC)
2. the medial prefrontal cortex present in all mammals (MPFC)

and the lateral prefrontal cortex (LPFC), consisting of:

1. the dorsolateral prefrontal cortex (DLPFC)
2. the ventrolateral prefrontal cortex (VLPFC) present only in primates.

The LPFC contains the Brodmann areas BA8, BA9, BA10, BA45, BA46, and BA47. Some researchers also include BA44. The vmPFC contains the Brodmann areas BA12, BA25, BA32, BA33, BA24, BA11, BA13, and BA14.

The table below shows different ways to subdivide parts of the human prefrontal cortex based upon Brodmann areas.

8	9	10	46	45	47	44	12	25	32	33	24	11	13	14
lateral							ventromedial							
dorsolateral				ventrolateral			medial					ventral		

- The dorsolateral prefrontal cortex is composed of the BA8, BA9, BA10, and BA46.
- The ventrolateral prefrontal cortex is composed of areas BA45, BA47, and BA44.
- The medial prefrontal cortex (mPFC) is composed of BA12, BA25, and anterior cingulate cortex: BA32, BA33, BA24. Within that area is the dorsal nexus, which interconnects many parts of the brain.
- The ventral prefrontal cortex is composed of areas BA11, BA13, and BA14. (Also see the definition of the orbitofrontal cortex.)
- The dorsolateral prefrontal cortex contains BA8, including the frontal eye fields.
- The ventrolateral prefrontal cortex contains BA45 which is part of Broca's area. Some researchers also include BA44 the other part of Broca's area.

=== Interconnections ===
The prefrontal cortex is highly interconnected with much of the brain, including extensive connections with other cortical, subcortical and brain stem sites. The dorsal prefrontal cortex is especially interconnected with brain regions involved with attention, cognition and action, while the ventral prefrontal cortex interconnects with brain regions involved with emotion. The prefrontal cortex also receives inputs from the brainstem arousal systems, and its function is particularly dependent on its neurochemical environment. Thus, there is coordination between one's state of arousal and mental state. The interplay between the prefrontal cortex and socioemotional system of the brain is relevant for adolescent development, as proposed by the Dual Systems Model.

The medial prefrontal cortex has been implicated in the generation of slow-wave sleep (SWS), and prefrontal atrophy has been linked to decreases in SWS. Prefrontal atrophy occurs naturally as individuals age, and it has been demonstrated that older adults experience impairments in memory consolidation as their medial prefrontal cortices degrade. In older adults, instead of being transferred and stored in the neocortex during SWS, memories start to remain in the hippocampus where they were encoded, as evidenced by increased hippocampal activation compared to younger adults during recall tasks, when subjects learned word associations, slept, and then were asked to recall the learned words.

The ventrolateral prefrontal cortex (VLPFC) has been implicated in various aspects of speech production and language comprehension. The VLPFC is richly connected to various regions of the brain including the lateral and medial temporal lobe, the superior temporal cortex, the infertemporal cortex, the perirhinal cortex, and the parahippoccampal cortex. These brain areas are implicated in memory retrieval and consolidation, language processing, and association of emotions. These connections allow the VLPFC to mediate explicit and implicit memory retrieval and integrate it with language stimulus to help plan coherent speech. In other words, choosing the correct words and staying "on topic" during conversation come from the VLPFC.

== Function ==
=== Executive function ===
The original studies of Fuster and of Goldman-Rakic emphasized the fundamental ability of the prefrontal cortex to represent information not currently in the environment, and the central role of this function in creating the "mental sketch pad". Goldman-Rakic spoke of how this representational knowledge was used to intelligently guide thought, action, and emotion, including the inhibition of inappropriate thoughts, distractions, actions, and feelings. In this way, working memory can be seen as fundamental to attention and behavioral inhibition. Fuster speaks of how this prefrontal ability allows the integration of past and future, allowing both cross-temporal and cross-modal associations in the creation of goal-directed, perception-action cycles. This ability to represent underlies all other higher executive functions. The prefrontal cortex is responsible for many executive functions, such as remembering information, cognitive flexibility, and inhibitory control. Although the prefrontal cortex does this, it does not carry out these responsibilities alone as other brain regions also play important roles during this. For example, the amygdala sends signals to the prefrontal cortex area known as 46d in order for one to comprehend the situation and to determine how to react.

Shimamura proposed Dynamic Filtering Theory to describe the role of the prefrontal cortex in executive functions. The prefrontal cortex is presumed to act as a high-level gating or filtering mechanism that enhances goal-directed activations and inhibits irrelevant activations. This filtering mechanism enables executive control at various levels of processing, including selecting, maintaining, updating, and rerouting activations. It has also been used to explain emotional regulation.

Miller and Cohen proposed an Integrative Theory of Prefrontal Cortex Function, that arises from the original work of Goldman-Rakic and Fuster. The two theorize that "cognitive control stems from the active maintenance of patterns of activity in the prefrontal cortex that represents goals and means to achieve them. They provide bias signals to other brain structures whose net effect is to guide the flow of activity along neural pathways that establish the proper mappings between inputs, internal states, and outputs needed to perform a given task". In essence, the two theorize that the prefrontal cortex guides the inputs and connections, which allows for cognitive control of our actions.

The prefrontal cortex is of significant importance when top-down processing is needed. Top-down processing by definition is when behavior is guided by internal states or intentions. According to the two, "The PFC is critical in situations when the mappings between sensory inputs, thoughts, and actions either are weakly established relative to other existing ones or are rapidly changing". An example of this can be portrayed in the Wisconsin Card Sorting Test (WCST). Subjects engaging in this task are instructed to sort cards according to the shape, color, or number of symbols appearing on them. The thought is that any given card can be associated with a number of actions and no single stimulus-response mapping will work. Human subjects with PFC damage are able to sort the card in the initial simple tasks, but unable to do so as the rules of classification change.

Miller and Cohen conclude that the implications of their theory can explain how much of a role the PFC has in guiding control of cognitive actions. In the researchers' own words, they claim that, "depending on their target of influence, representations in the PFC can function variously as attentional templates, rules, or goals by providing top-down bias signals to other parts of the brain that guide the flow of activity along the pathways needed to perform a task".

Experimental data indicate a role for the prefrontal cortex in mediating normal sleep physiology, dreaming and sleep-deprivation phenomena.

When analyzing and thinking about attributes of other individuals, the medial prefrontal cortex is activated, however, it is not activated when contemplating the characteristics of inanimate objects.

Studies using fMRI have shown that the medial prefrontal cortex (mPFC), specifically the anterior medial prefrontal cortex (amPFC), may modulate mimicry behavior. Neuroscientists are suggesting that social priming influences activity and processing in the amPFC, and that this area of the prefrontal cortex modulates mimicry responses and behavior.

As of recent, researchers have used neuroimaging techniques to find that along with the basal ganglia, the prefrontal cortex is involved with learning exemplars, which is part of the exemplar theory, one of the three main ways our mind categorizes things. The exemplar theory states that we categorize judgements by comparing it to a similar past experience within our stored memories.

A 2014 meta-analysis by Professor Nicole P.Yuan from the University of Arizona found that larger prefrontal cortex volume and greater PFC cortical thickness were associated with better executive performance.

=== Attention and memory ===
Lebedev et al. experiment that dissociated representation of spatial attention from representation of spatial memory in prefrontal cortex

A widely accepted theory regarding the function of the brain's prefrontal cortex is that it serves as a store of short-term memory. This idea was first formulated by Jacobsen, who reported in 1936 that damage to the primate prefrontal cortex caused short-term memory deficits. Karl Pribram and colleagues (1952) identified the part of the prefrontal cortex responsible for this deficit as area 46, also known as the dorsolateral prefrontal cortex (dlPFC). More recently, Goldman-Rakic and colleagues (1993) evoked short-term memory loss in localized regions of space by temporary inactivation of portions of the dlPFC. Once the concept of working memory (see also Baddeley's model of working memory) was established in contemporary neuroscience by Alan Baddeley (1986), these neuropsychological findings contributed to the theory that the prefrontal cortex implements working memory and, in some extreme formulations, only working memory. In the 1990s this theory developed a wide following, and it became the predominant theory of PF function, especially for nonhuman primates. The concept of working memory used by proponents of this theory focused mostly on the short-term maintenance of information, and rather less on the manipulation or monitoring of such information or on the use of that information for decisions. Consistent with the idea that the prefrontal cortex functions predominantly in maintenance memory, delay-period activity in the PF has often been interpreted as a memory trace. (The phrase "delay-period activity" applies to neuronal activity that follows the transient presentation of an instruction cue and persists until a subsequent "go" or "trigger" signal.)

To explore alternative interpretations of delay-period activity in the prefrontal cortex, Lebedev et al. (2004) investigated the discharge rates of single prefrontal neurons as monkeys attended to a stimulus marking one location while remembering a different, unmarked location. Both locations served as potential targets of a saccadic eye movement. Although the task made intensive demands on short-term memory, the largest proportion of prefrontal neurons represented attended locations, not remembered ones. These findings showed that short-term memory functions cannot account for all, or even most, delay-period activity in the part of the prefrontal cortex explored. The authors suggested that prefrontal activity during the delay-period contributes more to the process of attentional selection (and selective attention) than to memory storage.

=== Speech production and language ===
Various areas of the prefrontal cortex have been implicated in a multitude of critical functions regarding speech production, language comprehension, and response planning before speaking. Cognitive neuroscience has shown that the left ventrolateral prefrontal cortex is vital in the processing of words and sentences.

The right prefrontal cortex has been found to be responsible for coordinating the retrieval of explicit memory for use in speech, whereas the deactivation of the left is responsible for mediating implicit memory retrieval to be used in verb generation. Recollection of nouns (explicit memory) is impaired in some amnesic patients with damaged right prefrontal cortices, but verb generation remains intact because of its reliance on left prefrontal deactivation.

Many researchers now include BA45 in the prefrontal cortex because together with BA44 it makes up an area of the frontal lobe called Broca's area. Broca's Area is widely considered the output area of the language production pathway in the brain (as opposed to Wernicke's area in the medial temporal lobe, which is seen as the language input area). BA45 has been shown to be implicated for the retrieval of relevant semantic knowledge to be used in conversation/speech. The right lateral prefrontal cortex (RLPFC) is implicated in the planning of complex behavior, and together with bilateral BA45, they act to maintain focus and coherence during speech production. However, left BA45 has been shown to be activated significantly while maintaining speech coherence in young people. Older people have been shown to recruit the right BA45 more so than their younger counterparts. This aligns with the evidence of decreased lateralization in other brain systems during aging.

In addition, this increase in BA45 and RLPFC activity in combination of BA47 in older patients has been shown to contribute to "off-topic utterances." The BA47 area in the prefrontal cortex is implicated in "stimulus-driven" retrieval of less-salient knowledge than is required to contribute to a conversation. In other words, elevated activation of the BA47 together with altered activity in BA45 and the broader RLPFC has been shown to contribute to the inclusion of less relevant information and irrelevant tangential conversational speech patterns in older subjects.

== Clinical significance ==
In the last few decades, brain imaging systems have been used to determine brain region volumes and nerve linkages. Several studies have indicated that reduced volume and interconnections of the frontal lobes with other brain regions is observed in patients diagnosed with mental disorders; those subjected to repeated stressors; those who excessively consume sexually explicit materials; suicides; criminals; sociopaths; those affected by lead poisoning; it is believed that at least some of the human abilities to feel guilt or remorse, and to interpret reality, are dependent on a well-functioning prefrontal cortex. The advanced neurocircuitry and self-regulatory function of the human prefrontal cortex is also associated with the higher sentience and sapience of humans, as the prefrontal cortex in humans occupies a far larger percentage of the brain than in any other animal. It is theorized that, as the brain has tripled in size over five million years of human evolution, the prefrontal cortex has increased in size sixfold.

A review on executive functions in healthy exercising individuals noted that the left and right halves of the prefrontal cortex, which is divided by the medial longitudinal fissure, appears to become more interconnected in response to consistent aerobic exercise. Two reviews of structural neuroimaging research indicate that marked improvements in prefrontal and hippocampal gray matter volume occur in healthy adults that engage in medium intensity exercise for several months.

Chronic intake of alcohol leads to persistent alterations in brain function including altered decision-making ability. The prefrontal cortex of chronic alcoholics has been shown to be vulnerable to oxidative DNA damage and neuronal cell death.

== History ==
Perhaps the seminal case in prefrontal cortex function is that of Phineas Gage, whose left frontal lobe was destroyed when a large iron rod was driven through his head in an 1848 accident. The standard presentation is that, although Gage retained normal memory, speech and motor skills, his personality changed radically: He became irritable, quick-tempered, and impatient—characteristics he did not previously display — so that friends described him as "no longer Gage"; and, whereas he had previously been a capable and efficient worker, afterward he was unable to complete. However, careful analysis of primary evidence shows that descriptions of Gage's psychological changes are usually exaggerated when held against the description given by Gage's doctor, the most striking feature being that changes described years after Gage's death are far more dramatic than anything reported while he was alive.

Subsequent studies on patients with prefrontal injuries have shown that the patients verbalized what the most appropriate social responses would be under certain circumstances. Yet, when actually performing, they instead pursued behavior aimed at immediate gratification, despite knowing the longer-term results would be self-defeating.

The interpretation of this data indicates that not only are skills of comparison and understanding of eventual outcomes harbored in the prefrontal cortex but the prefrontal cortex (when functioning correctly) controls the mental option to delay immediate gratification for a better or more rewarding longer-term gratification result. This ability to wait for a reward is one of the key pieces that define optimal executive function of the human brain.

There is much current research devoted to understanding the role of the prefrontal cortex in neurological disorders. Clinical trials have begun on certain drugs that have been shown to improve prefrontal cortex function, including guanfacine, which acts through the alpha-2A adrenergic receptor. A downstream target of this drug, the HCN channel, is one of the most recent areas of exploration in prefrontal cortex pharmacology.

=== Etymology ===
The term "prefrontal" as describing a part of the brain appears to have been introduced by Richard Owen in 1868. For him, the prefrontal area was restricted to the anterior-most part of the frontal lobe (approximately corresponding to the frontal pole). It has been hypothesized that his choice of the term was based on the prefrontal bone present in most amphibians and reptiles.

== Additional images ==
Animation, prefrontal cortex of left cerebral hemisphere (shown in red)

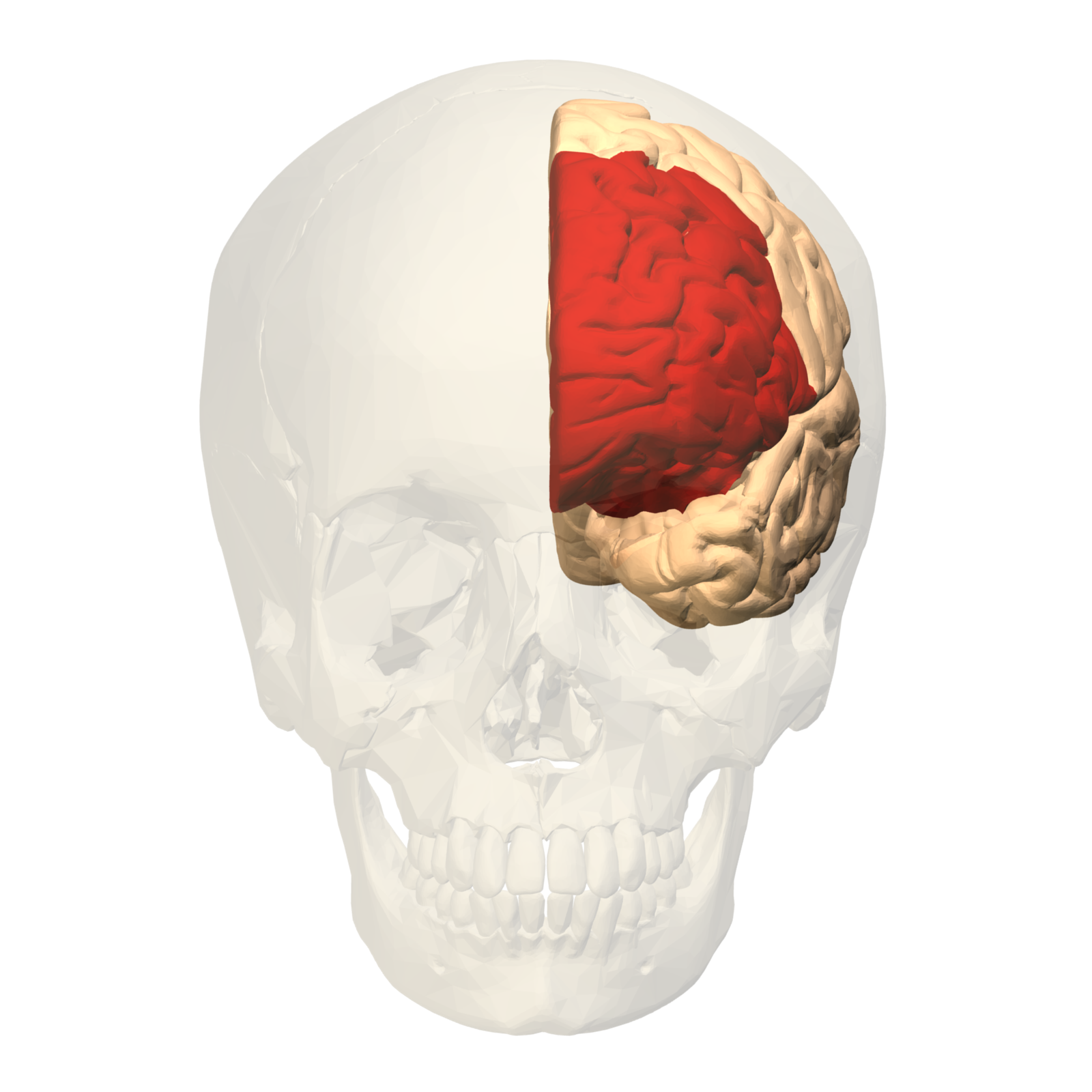
Front view

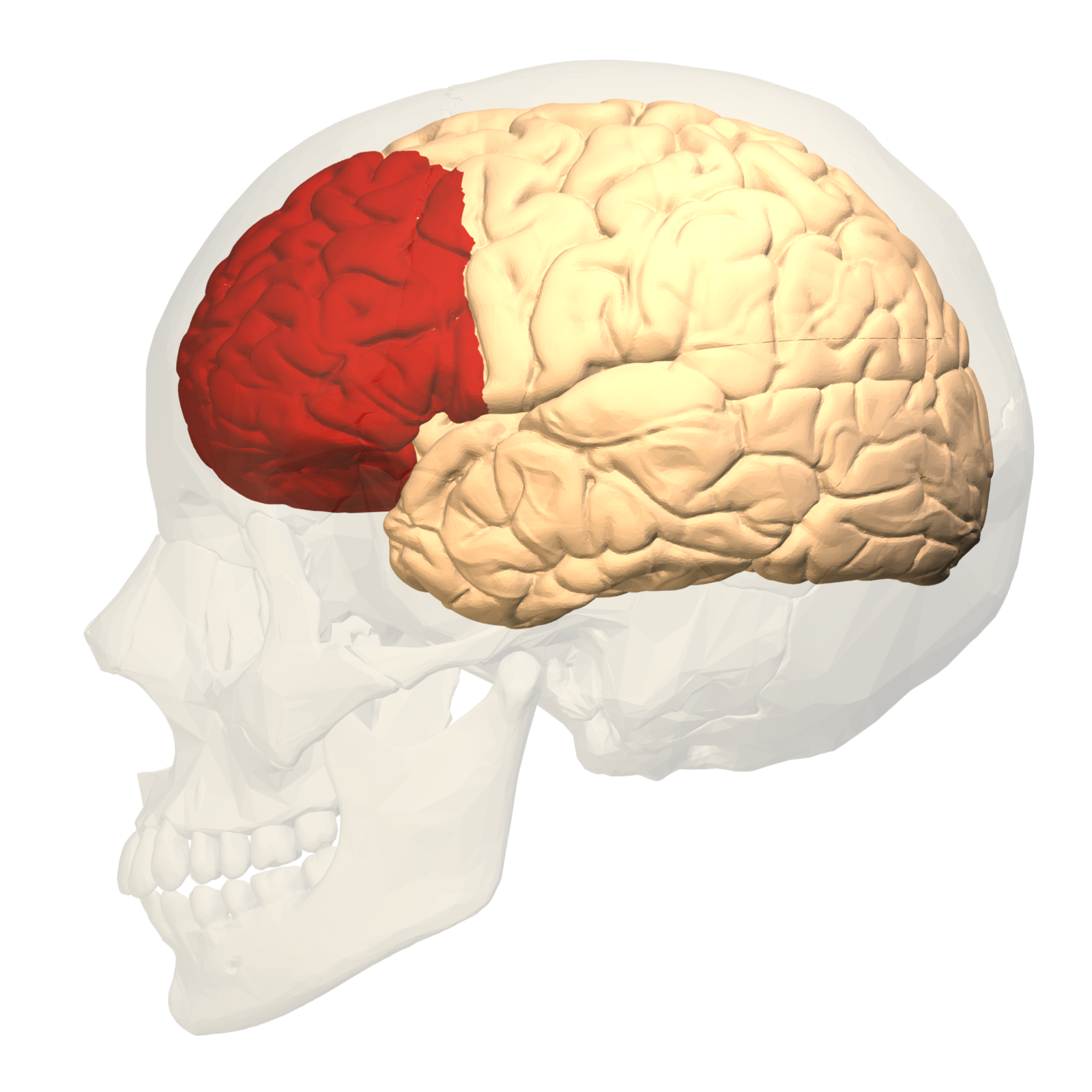
Lateral view

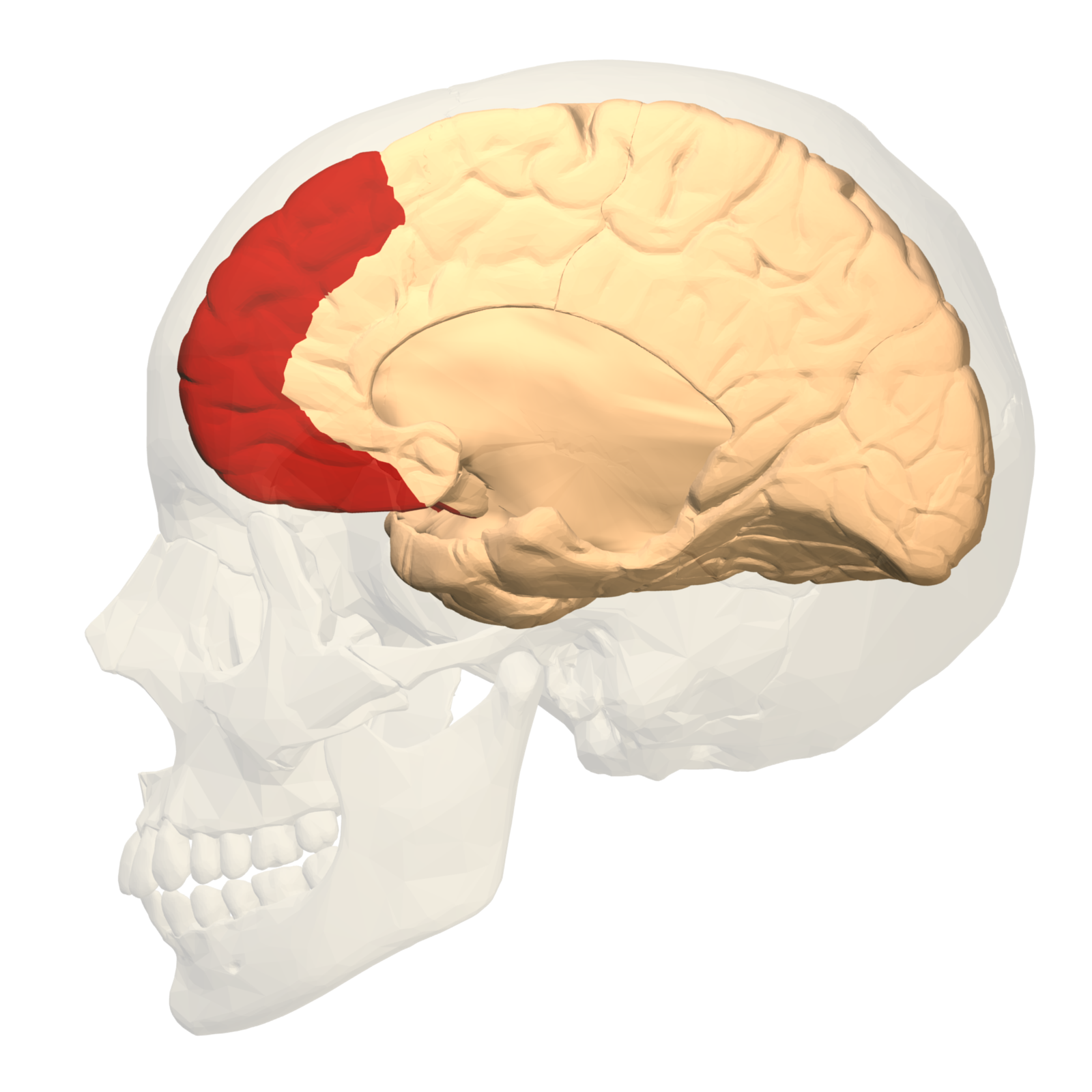
Medial perspective

== See also ==
- Dorsomedial prefrontal cortex
- Interference theory
- Lobotomy
- Self-model theory of subjectivity
- Ventromedial prefrontal cortex
