= Dorsomedial prefrontal cortex =

Area of some species' brains

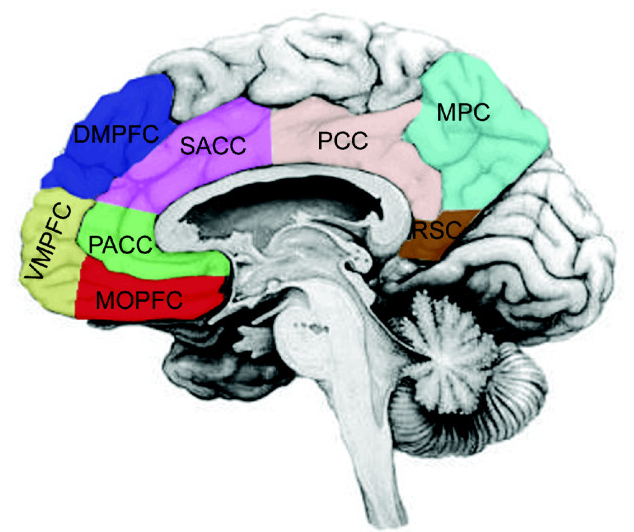
- The location of the dorsomedial prefrontal cortex is marked as "DMPFC"

Details
- Part of: Prefrontal cortex
- Parts: Anterior cingulate cortex, prelimbic cortex

The dorsomedial prefrontal cortex (dmPFC or DMPFC is a section of the prefrontal cortex in some species' brain anatomy. It includes portions of Brodmann areas BA8, BA9, BA10, BA24 and BA32, although some authors identify it specifically with BA8 and BA9. Some notable sub-components include the dorsal anterior cingulate cortex (BA24 and BA32), the prelimbic cortex, and the infralimbic cortex.

== Functions ==
Evidence shows that the dmPFC plays several roles in humans. The dmPFC is identified to play roles in processing a sense of self, integrating social impressions, theory of mind, morality judgments, empathy, decision making, altruism, fear and anxiety information processing, and top-down motor cortex inhibition. The dmPFC also modulates or regulates emotional responses and heart rate in situations of fear or stress and plays a role in long-term memory. Some argue that the dmPFC is made up of several smaller subregions that are more task-specific. The dmPFC is attributed with many roles in the brain. Despite this, there is no definitive understanding of the exact role dmPFC plays, and the underlying mechanisms giving rise to its function(s) in the brain remain to be seen.

=== Identity ===
The dmPFC is thought to be one component of how people formulate an identity, or a sense of self When actors were tasked with performing a character, fMRI scans showed relative suppression of the dmPFC compared to baseline tasks. This same deactivation was not seen in the other tasks performed by the actors. The authors theorize that this may be due to the actors actively suppressing their own sense of self to portray another character. Similarly, the dmPFC has been shown to be inactive in individuals with psychological disassociation.

=== Social judgments and theory of mind ===
Research has indicated that the dmPFC plays a role in creating social impressions. One study showed that by using transcranial magnetic stimulation (TMS) to the dmPFC during a social judgment task directly disrupts a person's ability to form social judgments. Additionally, the dmPFC is active when people are trying to understand the perspectives, beliefs, and thoughts of others, an ability known as Theory of mind. The dmPFC has also been shown to play a role in altruism. The amount that a person's dmPFC was active during a socially-based task predicted how much money that person would later donate to others. Furthermore, the dmPFC has been shown to be play a role in morality decisions.

=== Emotion ===
The dmPFC has been shown to be involved in voluntary and involuntary emotional regulation. When recalling negative memories, older adults show activation in the dmPFC. This is believed to act as mechanism that reduces the overall experienced negativity of the event. The dmPFC is thought to be impaired in individuals diagnosed with Bipolar Disorder resulting in disrupted emotional regulation.

=== Decision making ===
In addition to social judgments, the dmPFC shows increased activation during complex decision making tasks. Other studies have shown increased activation in the dmPFC when a person must decide between two equally-likely outcomes, as well as when a decision is counter to their behavioral tendencies.

== Other species ==
The DMPFC can also be identified in monkeys. The prelimbic system in mice is believed to be functionally analogous to the dmPFC's emotional regulation function in humans.

=== Animal models ===
In rats, the dmPFC has been shown to exert top-down control over the motor regions, although the exact mechanisms of how this is accomplished remain unknown. Another study looked at how dopamine receptors in the dmPFC play a role in regulating fear in rats.

An experiment with mice found that optogenetic stimulation of the dmPFC increased their perseverance, motivational drive and grit causing them to assume a more dominant role in social hierarchies. Additionally, researchers have shown that the dmPFC 5-HT6 receptors play a role in regulating anxiety-like behaviors in mice.

== See also ==
- Self-model theory of subjectivity
