= Brodmann area 32 =

Brain area

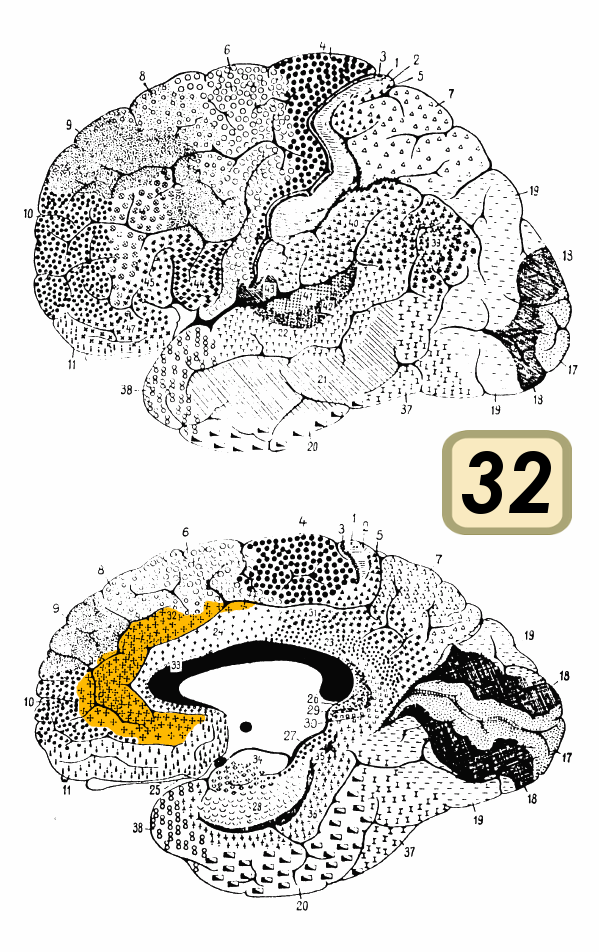
- Brodmann area 32 (shown in orange)

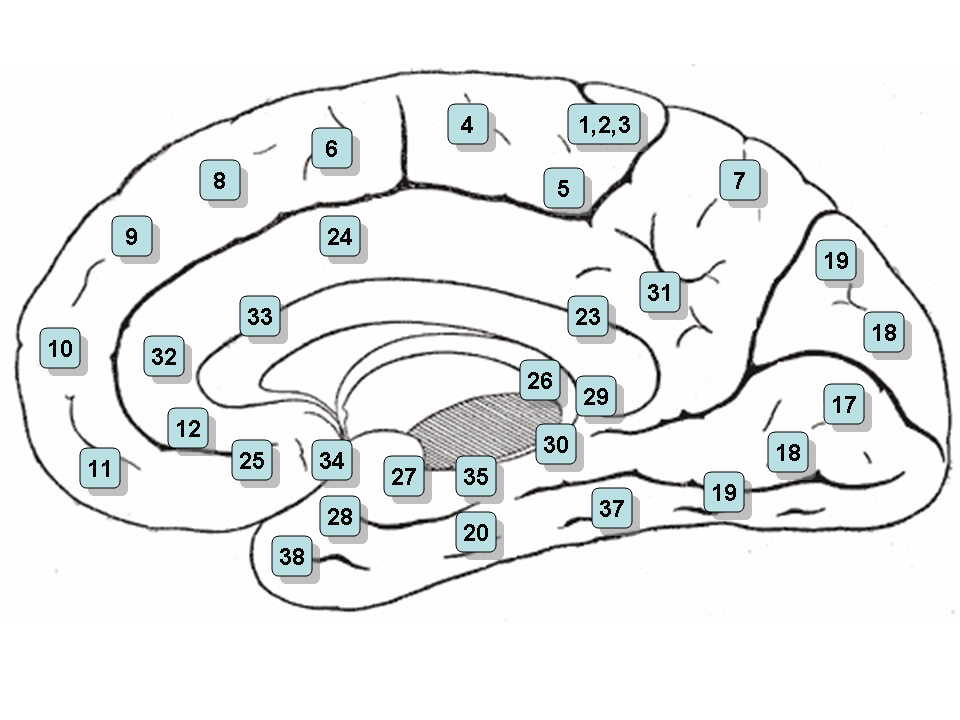
- Medial surface of the brain with Brodmann's areas numbered.

Details

Identifiers
- Latin: area cingularis anterior dorsalis
- NeuroNames: 1021
- NeuroLex ID: birnlex_1766
- FMA: 68629

The Brodmann area 32, also known in the human brain as the dorsal anterior cingulate area 32, refers to a subdivision of the cytoarchitecturally defined cingulate cortex. In the human it forms an outer arc around the anterior cingulate gyrus. The cingulate sulcus defines approximately its inner boundary and the superior rostral sulcus (H) its ventral boundary; rostrally it extends almost to the margin of the frontal lobe. Cytoarchitecturally it is bounded internally by the ventral anterior cingulate area 24, externally by medial margins of the agranular frontal area 6, intermediate frontal area 8, granular frontal area 9, frontopolar area 10, and prefrontal area 11-1909. (Brodmann19-09).

The dorsal region of the anterior cingulate gyrus is associated with rational thought processes, most notably active during the Stroop task.

== Guenon ==
In the guenon, Brodmann area 32 is a subdivision of the cytoarchitecturally defined cingulate region of cerebral cortex. This area was named 25 in Brodmann-1905 and labeled 25 in a figure contributed by Brodmann in Mauss-1908. In Brodmann-1909, however, the area was labeled 32 and the name "area 25" was attached to the area that has since been the accepted area 25 of Brodmann-1909 (Vogt-87). Distinguishing features according to Brodmann-1905: in contrast with area 6 of Brodmann-1909 the cortex of area 32 is relatively thick; the transition from cortex to white matter is more gradual; the distribution of cells is less dense; and there is no distinct boundary between the inner pyramidal layer (V) and the multiform layer (VI); it is similar to area 6 in the general absence of distinct layers, particularly of an internal granular layer (IV), but differs in that cells are smaller and there is an increased density of medium-sized pyramidal cells at the level of layer IV; this population of cells makes area 32 similar to the neighboring area 24 of Brodmann-1909; it differs from area 24 by its greater overall thickness and a particularly thick layer VI that merges gradually with the subcortical white matter. Brodmann-1909 regarded area 32 as topologically, but not cytoarchitecturally, homologous to the human dorsal anterior cingulate area 32; area 25 of Walker-1940 is topologically homologous to area 32.

== Image ==
Animation.

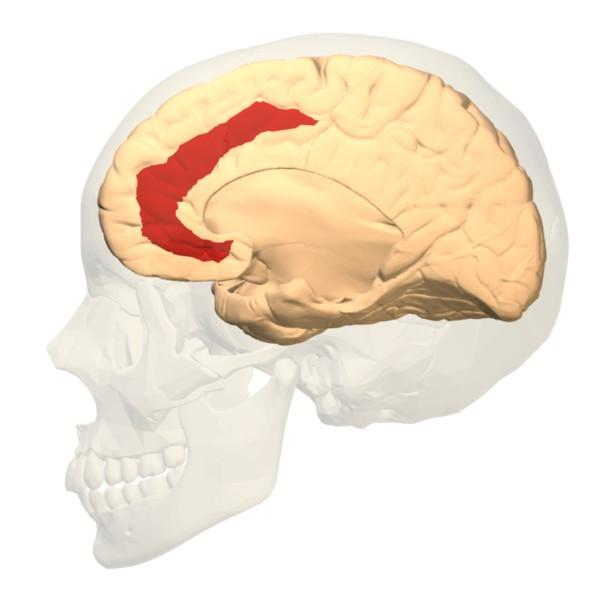
Medial view.

== See also ==
- Brodmann area
