= Area 14 =

Area 14 can refer to:

- Area 14 (Nevada National Security Site)
- Brodmann area 14
