= Von Economo neuron =

Specific class of mammalian cortical neurons

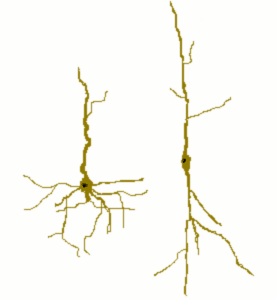
- Cartoon of a normal pyramidal cell (left) compared with a von Economo cell (right)

Details
- Location: Anterior cingulate cortex (ACC) and Fronto-insular cortex (FI)
- Shape: Unique spindle-shaped projection neuron
- Function: Global firing rate regulation and regulation of emotional state
- Presynaptic connections: Local input to ACC and FI
- Postsynaptic connections: Frontal and temporal cortex

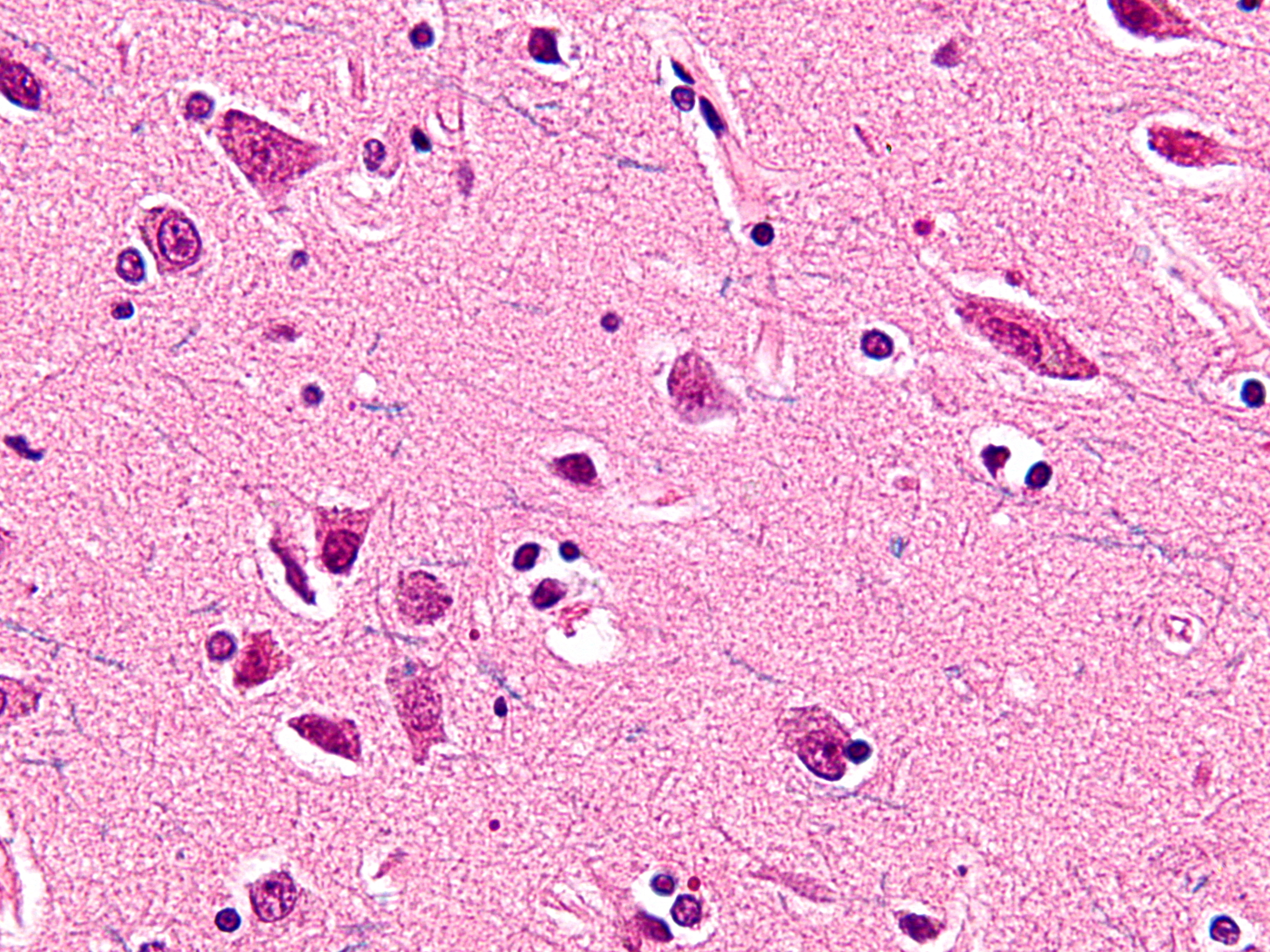
Micrograph showing a von Economo neuron of the cingulate. HE-LFB stain.

Von Economo neurons, also called spindle neurons, are a specific class of mammalian cortical neurons characterized by a large spindle-shaped soma (or body) gradually tapering into a single apical axon (the ramification that transmits signals) in one direction, with only a single dendrite (the ramification that receives signals) facing opposite. Other cortical neurons tend to have many dendrites, and the bipolar-shaped morphology of von Economo neurons is unique here.

Von Economo neurons are found in two very restricted regions in the brains of hominids (humans and other great apes): the anterior cingulate cortex (ACC) and the fronto-insular cortex (FI) (which each make up the salience network). In 2008, they were also found in the dorsolateral prefrontal cortex of humans. Von Economo neurons are also found in the brains of a number of cetaceans, and to a lesser extent in macaque monkeys, raccoons, the white-tailed deer, the pygmy hippopotamus, as well as domestic sheep and cows. VENs are also present in both African and Asian elephants, but are restricted to the anterior cingulate cortex of the Asian elephant and the anterior insula, frontal pole, and dorsolateral frontal region of the African elephant. The appearance of von Economo neurons in distantly related clades suggests that they represent convergent evolution of specialized pyramidal neurons in response to hitherto unidentified selective forces.

Von Economo neurons were discovered and first described in 1925 by Austrian psychiatrist and neurologist Constantin von Economo (1876–1931).

== Evolutionary function and significance ==
Although von Economo neurons initially attracted significant interest because it was believed that they were restricted to highly encephalized or socially complex species such as hominids, odontocetes, and elephants, this was revised by later research which discovered VENs in a wider range of mammalian species and taxa, including macaques, domestic sheep, cows, the pygmy hippopotamus, and white-tailed deer, suggesting a more basal function among various mammalian clades, although the precise function and selection pressures remain unknown and contested. Other researchers have questioned whether the spindle cells discovered in non-hominid species such as dolphins correspond to the specialized-stick-corkscrew-cells described by von Economo as distinct from the more commonly found spindle cells.

The distribution of VENs among cetacean species likewise contradicts any neat pattern linking VENs to increased cognition or social complexity. While VENs have a limited distribution among most cetacean species, they are most dense and ubiquitous across all cortical regions in the bowhead whale, which is the least encephalized of all cetaceans and lives a predominantly solitary lifestyle as most mysticetes do.

== In the anterior cingulate cortex ==
In 1999, American neuroscientist John Allman and colleagues at the California Institute of Technology first published a report on von Economo neurons found in the anterior cingulate cortex (ACC) of hominids but not any other species. Neuronal volumes of ACC von Economo neurons were larger in humans and bonobos than the von Economo neurons of the chimpanzee, gorilla and orangutan.

Allman and his colleagues have delved beyond the level of brain infrastructure to investigate how von Economo neurons function at the superstructural level, focusing on their role as "air traffic controllers for emotions ... at the heart of the human social emotion circuitry, including a moral sense". Allman's team proposes that von Economo neurons help channel neural signals from deep within the cortex to relatively distant parts of the brain. Specifically, Allman's team found signals from the ACC are received in Brodmann's area 10, in the frontal polar cortex, where regulation of cognitive dissonance (disambiguation between alternatives) is thought to occur. According to Allman, this neural relay appears to convey motivation to act, and concerns the recognition of error. Self-control – and avoidance of error – is thus facilitated by the executive gatekeeping function of the ACC, as it regulates the interference patterns of neural signals between these two brain regions.

In humans, intense emotion activates the anterior cingulate cortex, as it relays neural signals transmitted from the amygdala (a primary processing center for emotions) to the frontal cortex, perhaps by functioning as a sort of lens to focus the complex texture of neural signal interference patterns. The ACC is also active during demanding tasks requiring judgement and discrimination and when errors are detected by an individual. During difficult tasks, or when experiencing intense love, anger, or lust, activation of the ACC increases. In brain imaging studies, the ACC has specifically been found to be active when mothers hear infants cry, underscoring its role in affording a heightened degree of social sensitivity.

The ACC is a relatively ancient cortical region and is involved with many autonomic functions, including motor and digestive functions, while also playing a role in the regulation of blood pressure and heart rate. Significant olfactory and gustatory capabilities of the ACC and fronto-insular cortex appear to have been usurped, during recent evolution, to serve enhanced roles related to higher cognition – ranging from planning and self-awareness to role-playing and deception.

== In the fronto-insular cortex ==
At a Society for Neuroscience meeting in 2003, Allman reported on von Economo neurons his team found in another brain region, the fronto-insular cortex, a region which appears to have undergone significant evolutionary adaptations in mankind – perhaps as recently as 100,000 years ago.

This fronto-insular cortex is closely connected to the insula, a region that is roughly the size of a thumb in each hemisphere of the human brain. The insula and fronto-insular cortex are part of the insular cortex, wherein the elaborate circuitry associated with spatial awareness are found, and where self-awareness and the complexities of emotion are thought to be generated and experienced. Moreover, this region of the right hemisphere is crucial to navigation and perception of three-dimensional rotations.

== Concentrations ==
=== Anterior cingulate cortex ===
The largest number of ACC von Economo neurons are found in humans, fewer in the gracile great apes, and fewest in the robust great apes. In both humans and bonobos they are often found in clusters of 3 to 6 neurons. They are found in humans, chimpanzees, gorillas, orangutans, some cetaceans, and elephants. While total quantities of ACC von Economo neurons were not reported by Allman in his seminal research report (as they were in a later report describing their presence in the frontoinsular cortex, below), his team's initial analysis of the ACC layer V in hominids revealed an average of ~9 von Economo neurons per section for orangutans (rare, 0.6% of section cells), ~22 for gorillas (frequent, 2.3%), ~37 for chimpanzees (abundant, 3.8%), ~68 for bonobos (abundant/clusters, 4.8%), ~89 for humans (abundant/clusters, 5.6%).

=== Fronto-insular cortex ===
All of the primates examined had more von Economo neurons in the fronto-insula of the right hemisphere than in the left. In contrast to the higher number of von Economo neurons found in the ACC of the gracile bonobos and chimpanzees, the number of fronto-insular von Economo neurons was far higher in the cortex of robust gorillas (no data for orangutans was given). An adult human had 82,855 such cells, a gorilla had 16,710, a bonobo had 2,159, and a chimpanzee had a mere 1,808 – despite the fact that chimpanzees and bonobos are great apes most closely related to humans.

=== Dorsolateral prefrontal cortex ===
Von Economo neurons have been located in the dorsolateral prefrontal cortex of humans and elephants. In humans they have been observed in higher concentration in Brodmann area 9 (BA9) – mostly isolated, or in clusters of 2, while in Brodmann area 24 (BA24) they have been found mostly in clusters of 2–4.

== Clinical significance ==
Abnormal von Economo neuron development may be linked to several psychotic disorders, typically those characterized by distortions of reality, disturbances of thought, disturbances of language, and withdrawal from social contact. Altered von Economo neuron states have been implicated in both schizophrenia and autism, but research into these correlations remains at a very early stage. Frontotemporal dementia involves loss of mostly von Economo neurons. An initial study suggested that Alzheimer's disease specifically targeted von Economo neurons; this study was performed with end-stage Alzheimer brains in which cell destruction was widespread, but later it was found that Alzheimer's disease does not affect the von Economo neurons.

== See also ==
- List of distinct cell types in the adult human body
