= Area 9 =

Area 9 can refer to:

- Area 9 (Nevada National Security Site)
- Brodmann area 9
