= Area 11 =

Area 11 may refer to:

- Area 11 (Nevada Test Site), one section of the Nevada Test Site
- Brodmann area 11, an area of the brain
- A fictional name for Japan in the anime Code Geass
- Area 11 (band), an alternative rock band from Nottingham, England
