= Area 13 =

Area 13 can refer to:

- Area 13 (NTS), the site of the Project 57 nuclear test program
- Brodmann area 13
