= Granular layer =

Granular layer may refer to:

- Internal granular layer and External granular layer (cerebral cortex) of the cerebral cortex
- Granular layer (cerebellum) of the cortex of the human cerebellum
- Granular layer of skin
- Granular layer of dentate gyrus
