= Area 8 =

Area 8 can refer to:

- Area 8 (Nevada National Security Site)
- Brodmann area 8
