= BA6 =

BA6 may refer to:

- BA6, a postcode district in the BA postcode area
- BA-6, an armored car developed in the Soviet Union in the 1930s
- Brodmann area 6, a part of the frontal cortex in human brain
