= Area 6 =

Area 6 may refer to:

- Area 6 (NTS) one of the test areas on the Nevada National Security Site
- Area 6, the sixth level and defense outpost of planet Venom in the video game Star Fox 64/Lylat Wars
- Brodmann area 6
