= Brodmann area 12 =

Brain area

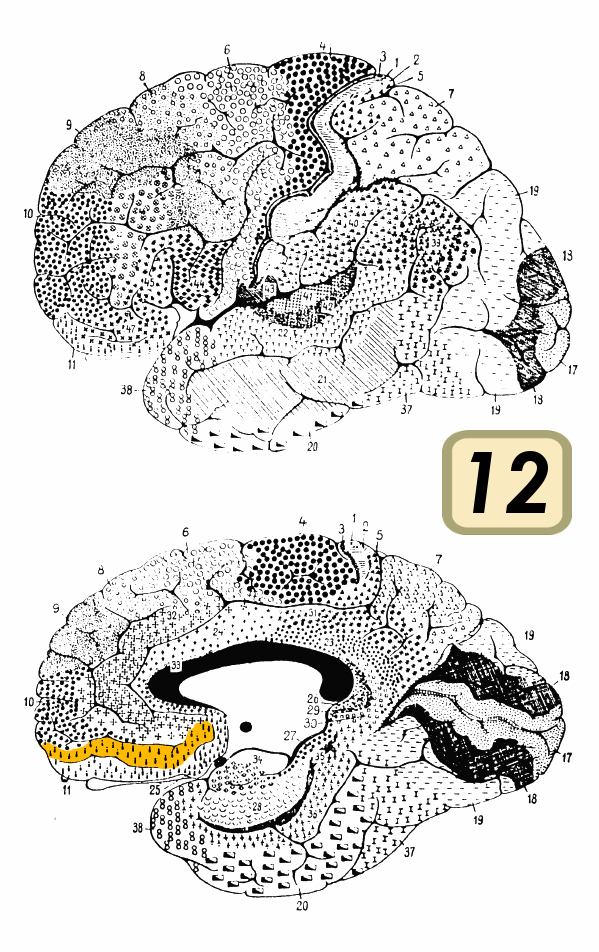
- Brodmann area 12(shown in orange)

- Image of brain with Brodmann areas numbered

Identifiers
- NeuroNames: 77
- NeuroLex ID: birnlex_1743
- FMA: 68609

Brodmann area 12 is a subdivision of the cerebral cortex of the guenon defined on the basis of cytoarchitecture. It occupies the most rostral portion of the frontal lobe. Brodmann-1909 did not regard it as homologous, either topographically or cytoarchitecturally, to rostral area 12 of the human. Distinctive features (Brodmann-1905): a quite distinct internal granular layer (IV) separates slender pyramidal cells of the external pyramidal layer (III) and the internal pyramidal layer (V); the multiform layer (VI) is expanded, contains widely dispersed spindle cells and merges gradually with the underlying cortical white matter; all cells, including the pyramidal cells of the external and internal pyramidal layers are inordinately small; the internal pyramidal layer (V) also contains spindle cells in groups of two to five located close to its border with the internal granular layer (IV).

It is indirectly connected to the globus pallidus as well as the substantia nigra, due to efferents to the striatum. Glutaminergic input is turned into GABAergic input there, which allows the frontal lobes to exhibit some control over basal ganglia activity.

== Image ==
Animation.

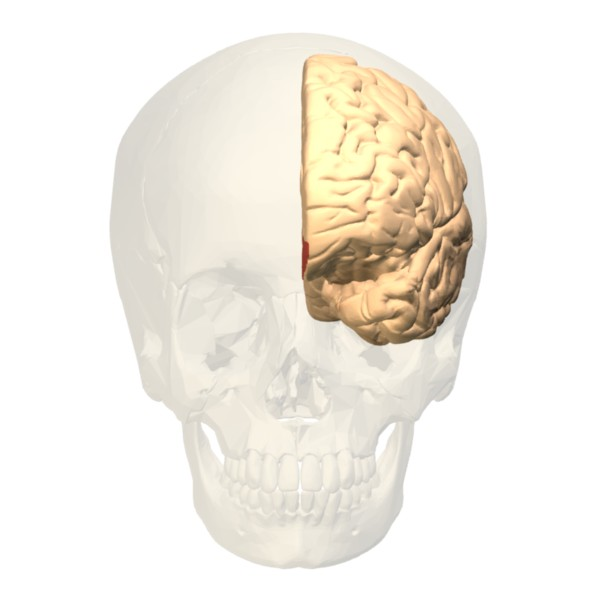
Frontal view.

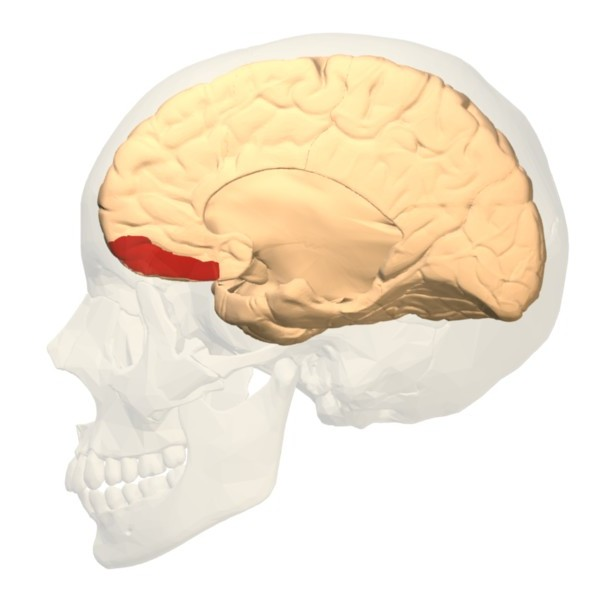
Medial view.

== See also ==
- Brodmann area
- List of regions in the human brain
