= External granular layer =

External granular layer may refer to:

- External granular layer of the cerebellar cortex
- External granular layer of the cerebral cortex
