= Brodmann area 14 =

Brain area

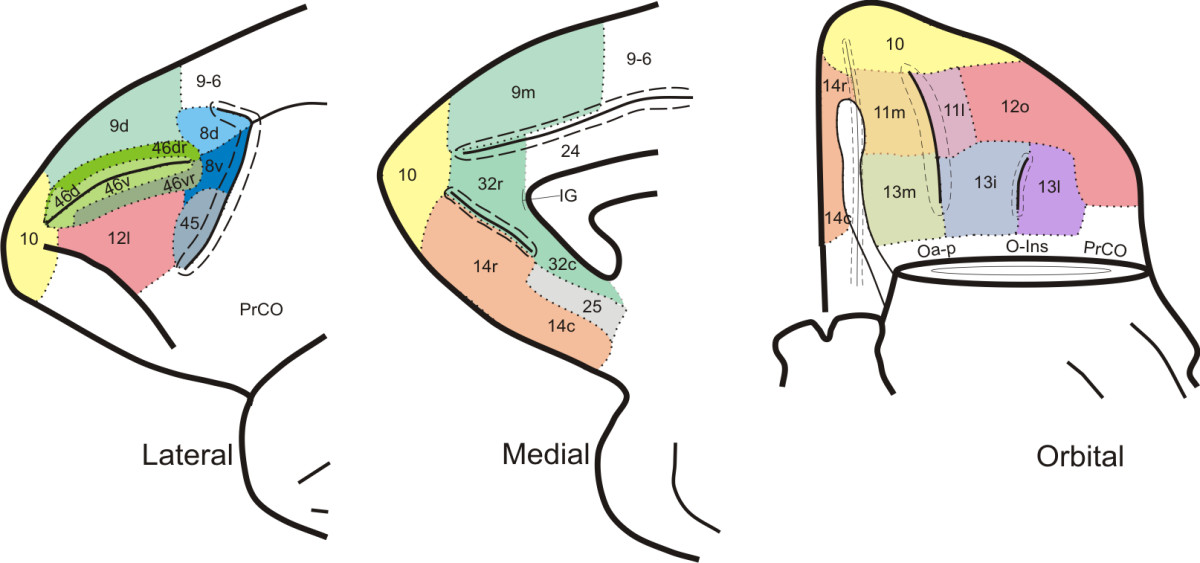
- Frontal cortex of Sapajus sp. BA14 is shown in the diagram at center and right (medial and orbital surface).

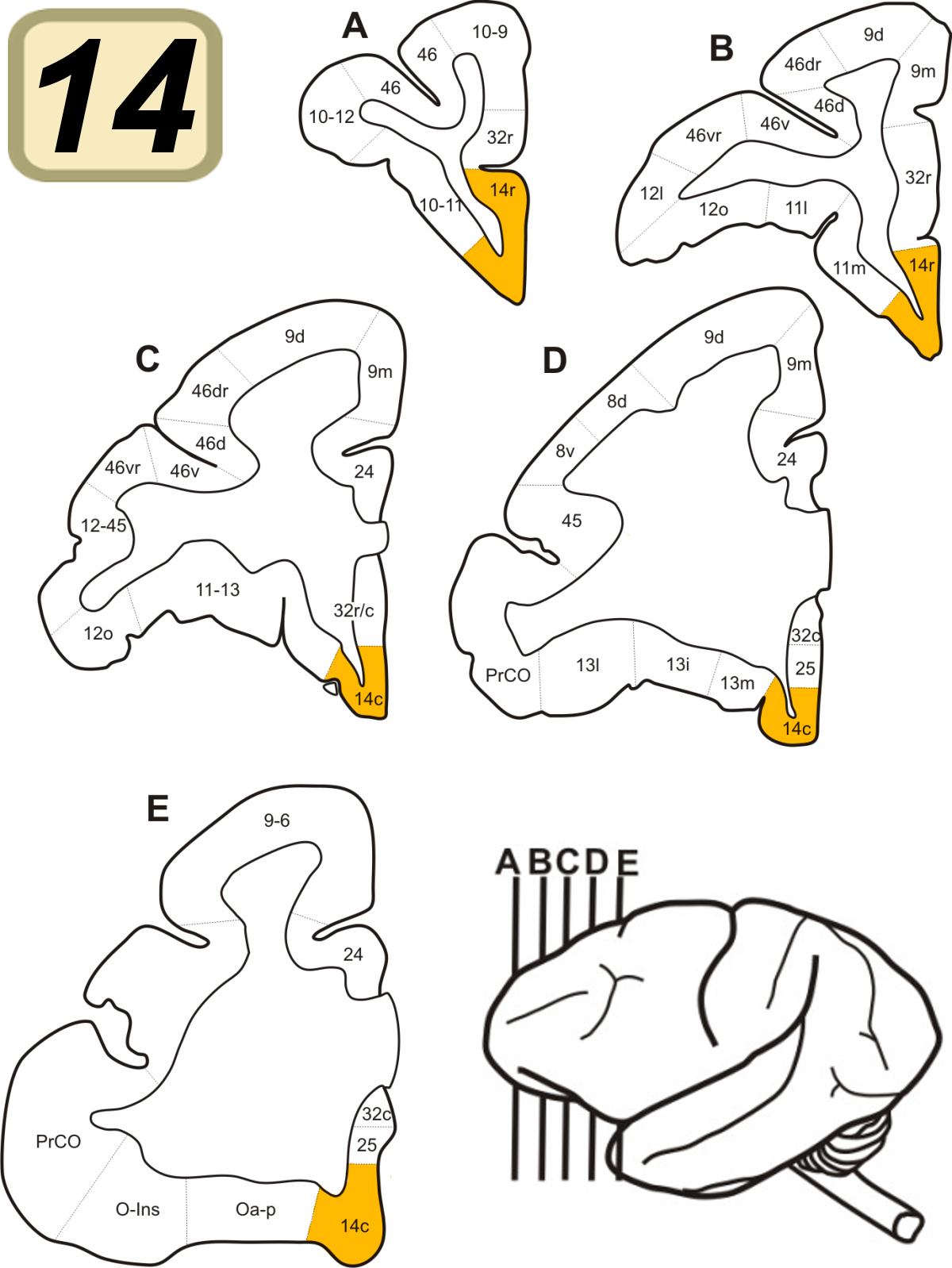
- Prefrontal cortex of Sapajus. BA14 is shown in orange through some coronal sections.

Identifiers
- NeuroNames: 1008
- NeuroLex ID: birnlex_1745
- FMA: 68611

Brodmann Area 14 is one of Brodmann's subdivisions of the cerebral cortex in the brain. It was defined by Brodmann in the guenon monkey . While Brodmann, writing in 1909, argued that no equivalent structure existed in humans, later work demonstrated that area 14 has a clear homologue in the human ventromedial prefrontal cortex.

== Anatomy ==
Brodmann areas were defined based on cytoarchitecture rather than function. Area 14 differs most clearly from Brodmann area 13-1905 in that it lacks a distinct internal granular layer (IV). Other differences are a less distinct external granular layer (II), a widening of the relatively cell-free zone of the external pyramidal layer (III); cells in the internal pyramidal layer (V) are denser and rounded; and the cells of the multiform layer (VI) assume a more distinct tangential orientation.

== Function ==
According to one theory, Area 14 is believed to serve as association cortex for the visceral senses and olfaction along with Area 51. Its anatomical inputs also suggest that it helps to aggregate autonomic information.

== See also ==
- Brodmann area
- List of regions in the human brain
