= Brodmann area 9 =

Part of the frontal cortex in the brain of humans and other primates

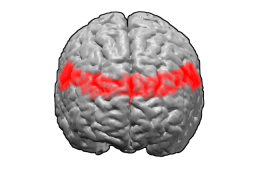

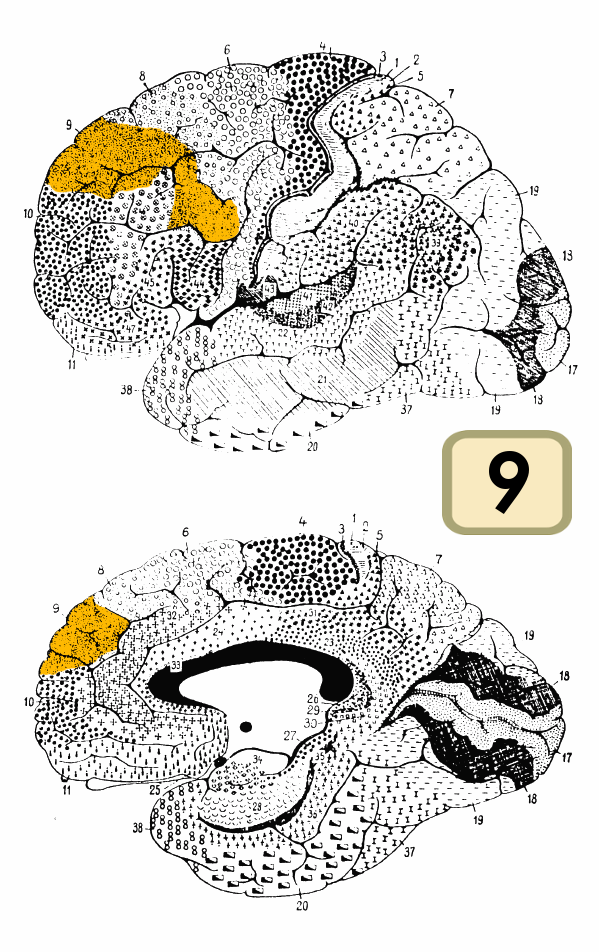

Details

Identifiers
- Latin: area frontalis granularis
- NeuroNames: 1024
- NeuroLex ID: birnlex_1740
- FMA: 68606

Brodmann area 9, or BA9, refers to a cytoarchitecturally defined portion of the frontal cortex in the brain of humans and other primates. Its cytoarchitecture is referred to as granular due to the concentration of granule cells in layer IV. It contributes to the dorsolateral and medial prefrontal cortex.

== Functions ==
Research has identified the area as being variously involved in short term memory, verbal fluency, error detection, auditory verbal attention, and inductive reasoning; functions also include evaluating recency, overriding automatic responses, inferring the intention of others, inferring deduction from spatial imagery, and attributing intention. In one investigation, the area saw engagement while study participants counted a series of auditory stimuli. The area displays lower levels of energy consumption in individuals suffering from bipolar disorder.

The area found on the left hemisphere is at least partially responsible for working memory, empathy, idiom comprehension, and self-criticism. Additional capabilities encompass processing pleasant and unpleasant emotional scenes, and attending to negative emotions.

On the right hemisphere, the region is involved in the attribution of intention, theory of mind, working memory, and spatial memory. Recognition and recall are also capabilities, while further functions in this area encompass planning, calculation, religiosity, semantic and perceptual processing of odors, recognition of others' emotions, and attention to positive emotions.

== Guenon ==
Brodmann area 9 also exists in the frontal lobe of the guenon. Brodmann-1909 regarded it on the whole as topographically and cytoarchitecturally homologous to the granular frontal area 9 and frontopolar area 10 in the human. Distinctive features (Brodmann-1905): Unlike Brodmann area 6 (Brodmann-1909), area 9 has a distinct internal granular layer (IV); unlike Brodmann area 6 or Brodmann area 8 (Brodmann-1909), its internal pyramidal layer (V) is divisible into two sublayers, an outer layer 5a of densely distributed medium-size ganglion cells that partially merges with layer IV, and an inner, clearer, cell-poor layer 5b; the pyramidal cells of sublayer 3b of the external pyramidal layer (III) are smaller and sparser in distribution; the external granular layer (II) is narrow, with small numbers of sparsely distributed granule cells.

== Image ==
Animation.

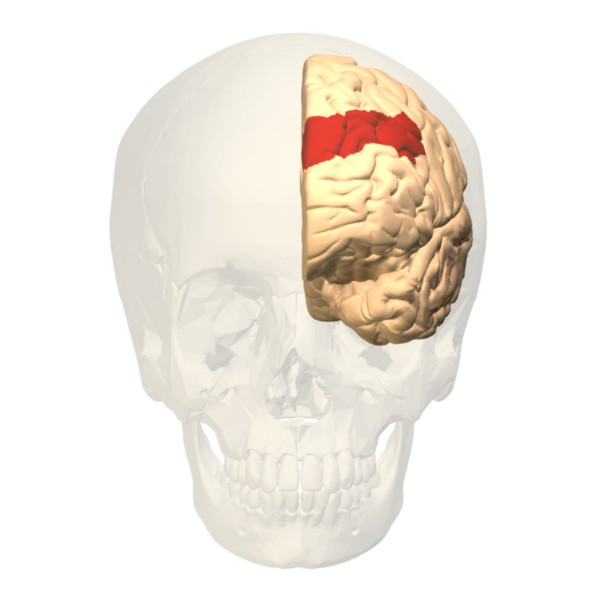
front view.

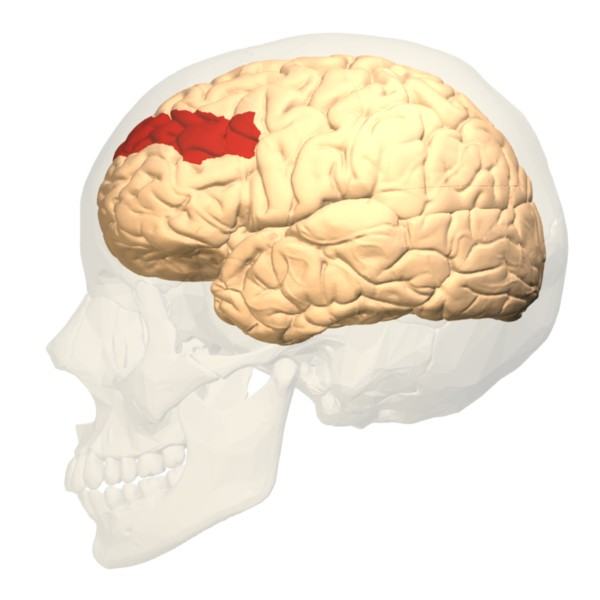
Lateral view.

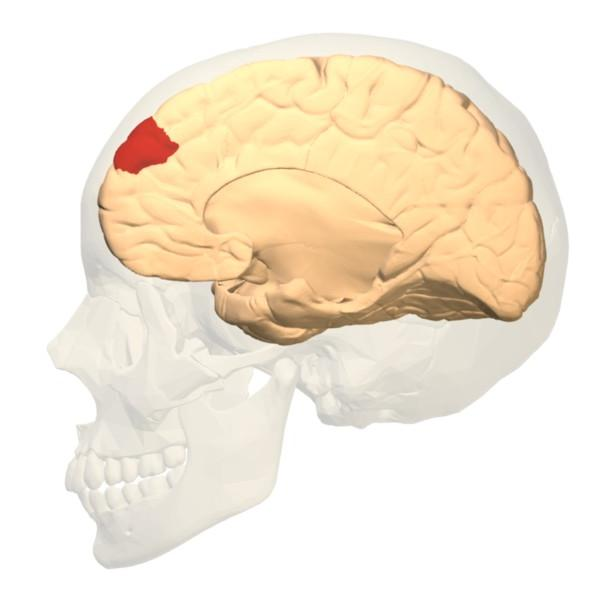
Medial view.

== See also ==
- Brodmann area
- Dorsomedial prefrontal cortex
- List of regions in the human brain
