= Joaquin Fuster =

Spanish neuroscientist

Joaquin M. Fuster
- Born: 1930 (age 95–96); Barcelona, Spain
- Citizenship: United States
- Education: M.D. University of Barcelona, 1953; Ph.D. University of Granada (Spain), 1967
- Known for: Discovery of "memory cells" in primate prefrontal cortex
- Awards: Goldman-Rakic Prize for Outstanding Achievement in Cognitive Neuroscience (2006)
- Scientific career
- Fields: Cognitive Neuroscience; Neuroscience; Cognitive science
- Workplaces: UCLA
- Website: joaquinfuster.com

Joaquín M. Fuster (born August 17, 1930) is a Spanish-born American neuroscientist known for his research on the prefrontal cortex and the cortical basis of memory. He is Distinguished Professor Emeritus of Psychiatry and Biobehavioral Sciences at the University of California, Los Angeles (UCLA), with which he has been affiliated since 1956. In 1971, with his graduate student Garrett Alexander, he reported "memory cells": neurons in the prefrontal cortex of awake monkeys that stay active while information is held in short-term memory. He later proposed that memory and knowledge are stored in widely distributed, overlapping cortical networks, which he calls "cognits", and that the prefrontal cortex organizes behavior over time through a "perception–action cycle". He has written several books, including five editions of The Prefrontal Cortex (1980–2015), and more than 200 articles.

== Early life and education ==
Born in Barcelona, Fuster is the eldest of five children of a psychiatrist who directed two of the city's public mental-health institutions in succession, later opened a private psychiatric hospital, and eventually held a university chair. His maternal grandfather, Valentí Carulla i Margenat, was a professor of medicine and rector of the University of Barcelona from 1913 until his death in 1923; he was made Marquis of Carulla in 1919. His younger brother is the cardiologist Valentín Fuster (born 1943). Fuster estimates that four generations of his family have produced 15 to 20 physicians. His 2020 memoir, El telar mágico de la mente ("The magic loom of the mind"), recalls his childhood during the Spanish Civil War and the influence of this medical family on his choice of career.

Fuster earned an M.D. at the University of Barcelona in 1953. He trained in psychiatry in Barcelona and in Innsbruck, Austria. In Innsbruck he read the work of the UCLA neurophysiologist Horace W. Magoun on the brainstem reticular formation; he wrote to Magoun in 1954 and was invited to spend a year in his laboratory. Supported by a Del Amo fellowship, he arrived in the United States in February 1956 and went straight on to UCLA. He received a Ph.D. from the University of Granada in 1967, for a thesis based on his 1958 study of brainstem stimulation and visual perception in monkeys, submitted at the invitation of the Granada anatomist Fernando Reinoso-Suárez, with whom he also collaborated at UCLA.

== Career ==
At UCLA Fuster joined the group of Horace Magoun, which also included Robert Livingston and Donald Lindsley, and held research and teaching appointments in the departments of psychiatry and anatomy. He became a member of the Brain Research Institute in 1961. From 1962 to 1964 he was a visiting scientist at the Max Planck Institute for Psychiatry in Munich, in Otto Creutzfeldt's department of neurophysiology, where he studied intracellular recordings and the statistics of neuronal firing in the visual system. He returned to the United States in October 1964 as a permanent resident. While holding an NIMH career investigator award he also undertook formal training at the Los Angeles Institute for Psychoanalysis, without intending to practise as an analyst. He was appointed professor of psychiatry at UCLA in 1967 and became professor emeritus in 2002. As of 2015 he was a member of UCLA's Brain Research Institute and of its Semel Institute for Neuroscience and Human Behavior. His awards from the National Institute of Mental Health include a Career Investigator Award (1960) and a Senior Scientist Award (1990).

A bequest from Fuster and his wife endowed the Joaquin M. Fuster Chair in Cognitive Neuroscience at UCLA; its first holder was the neuroimaging researcher Susan Bookheimer, from 2008 to 2024.

== Research ==
=== Perception and the visual system ===
In his first Science paper (1958), Fuster reported that electrical stimulation of the brainstem reticular formation improved monkeys' discrimination of very briefly shown visual stimuli and shortened their reaction times, an early demonstration that brain stimulation can improve perception. In 1959 he reported that very small doses of LSD impaired visual discrimination in monkeys. He went on to study how reticular activation affects single neurons of the visual cortex and lateral geniculate nucleus in rabbits, showing in a second Science paper (1961) that reticular stimulation could excite or inhibit visual cortical neurons. With Art Uyeda he later recorded neurons in the amygdala of monkeys that responded to cues signalling food or electric shock.

=== Prefrontal cortex and memory cells ===
With Larry Ott, an engineer at Hughes Aircraft, Fuster built thermoelectric probes that could cool and reversibly switch off small areas of cortex. Cooling the prefrontal cortex impaired monkeys' performance of delayed-response tasks, in which an animal must remember a cue for several seconds before acting on it. In 1971 Fuster and Alexander recorded single neurons in the prefrontal cortex of monkeys performing such a task and found many cells whose firing rose and stayed elevated during the delay, while the information had to be held in mind. The same year, Kubota and Niki reported prefrontal unit activity in monkeys performing a delayed-alternation task. The American Academy of Arts and Sciences describes Fuster as the first to record "memory cells from the frontal cortex of awake, behaving monkeys", and this persistent "delay activity" became a central topic in research on working memory. Fuster and Alexander found similar activity in the mediodorsal nucleus of the thalamus, which is closely connected with the prefrontal cortex, and Fuster described prefrontal delay activity in detail in 1973.

=== Memory outside the frontal lobe ===
Fuster found memory-related activity in other areas of cortex. With John Jervey he reported in 1981 that neurons in the inferotemporal cortex distinguished colors and kept firing for the remembered color during the delay of a visual memory task. Later studies by his group, with Kevin Koch and Yong-Di Zhou, described cells with similar activity for touch in the parietal and somatosensory cortex. In 2000 Fuster, Mark Bodner and James Kroger reported in Nature that prefrontal neurons can associate a tone with a color across a delay, linking information from two senses over time. His group also used positron emission tomography in humans and near-infrared spectroscopy in monkeys to study the cortical networks of working memory.

=== Woodpeckers and head injury ===
With the UCLA psychiatrist Philip May, Fuster studied how woodpeckers avoid brain injury while pecking, in papers in The Lancet (1976) and Archives of Neurology (1979).

== Theoretical work ==
=== Perception–action cycle ===
Fuster argues that the main role of the prefrontal cortex is the temporal organization of behavior: it integrates information over time so that goal-directed sequences of action, speech and reasoning can be carried out. He describes this through the "perception–action cycle", the circular flow of information between an organism and its environment in which perception guides action and the results of action change later perception. Borrowing a phrase from the Swedish neuroscientist David Ingvar, he describes the prefrontal cortex as serving a "memory of the future", and with Steven Bressler he has argued that it uses stored knowledge to predict and prepare for coming events.

=== Network memory and the cognit ===
In Memory in the Cerebral Cortex (1995) and a 1997 review, Fuster proposed that memories are not held in dedicated modules but in widely distributed networks of cortical neurons, formed by association through experience. In Cortex and Mind (2003) he called these networks "cognits": overlapping, interconnected networks organized hierarchically, with sensory and motor memories in lower areas of cortex and more abstract knowledge in higher association areas. In this model, working memory is the temporary activation of long-term cognits, sustained by reentrant activity between posterior and frontal cortex. The American Academy of Arts and Sciences has credited his work with helping to establish the now-dominant view that the prefrontal cortex works within a distributed cortical network to exert top-down control over perception, behavior, language and reasoning. With the engineer Simon Haykin he has applied the perception–action cycle to the design of "cognitive dynamic systems" in engineering.

=== Hayek and the neuroscience of freedom ===
Fuster names the economist Friedrich Hayek's 1952 book The Sensory Order as the strongest influence on his network view of memory, and has written on how Hayek anticipated ideas of modern cognitive neuroscience. In The Neuroscience of Freedom and Creativity (2013), translated into Spanish as Cerebro y libertad (2014), he argues that our capacity to choose among alternatives arises from the cortex, guided by the prefrontal cortex, in constant exchange with the environment through the perception–action cycle. The book received an honorable mention in the 2013 PROSE Awards for biomedicine and neuroscience.

== Personal life ==
Fuster and his wife, Elisabeth, have three children, six grandchildren and one great-grandchild.

== Honors and recognition ==
His honors include:

- 1995 – Ojemann Lecture, University of Iowa
- 1997 – Member of Honor (Académico de Honor), Royal National Academy of Medicine of Spain
- 1997 – Elsevier Lecture, European Brain and Behaviour Society, of which he is an honorary member
- 2000 – Jean-Louis Signoret Prize, University of Paris
- 2000 – Fyssen Foundation International Prize (theme: intentionality and the planning of action)
- 2004 – Honorary doctorate, Miguel Hernández University of Elche, Spain
- 2006 – Goldman-Rakic Prize for Cognitive Neuroscience, NARSAD
- 2007 – George A. Miller Prize in Cognitive Neuroscience, Cognitive Neuroscience Society
- 2009 – Honorary doctorate, Autonomous University of Madrid
- 2009 – Norman Geschwind Memorial Lecture, Harvard Medical School
- 2010 – Woolsey Lecture, University of Wisconsin
- 2010 – Elected Fellow, American Academy of Arts and Sciences
- 2010 – Segerfalk Lecture Award, Thorsten and Elsa Segerfalk Foundation, Lund, Sweden
- 2014 – Honorary doctorate, Universidad Francisco Marroquín, Guatemala
- 2017 – Fellow, American Association for the Advancement of Science

== Selected works ==
=== Books ===
- The Prefrontal Cortex: Anatomy, Physiology, and Neuropsychology of the Frontal Lobe. Raven Press, 1980; 5th edition (The Prefrontal Cortex), Academic Press, 2015.
- Memory in the Cerebral Cortex: An Empirical Approach to Neural Networks in the Human and Nonhuman Primate. MIT Press, 1995.
- Cortex and Mind: Unifying Cognition. Oxford University Press, 2003.
- The Neuroscience of Freedom and Creativity: Our Predictive Brain. Cambridge University Press, 2013.
- Cerebro y libertad: los cimientos cerebrales de nuestra capacidad para elegir. Ariel, 2014.
- El telar mágico de la mente: mi vida en neurociencia. Ariel, 2020.

=== Selected articles ===
- Fuster, J. M.; Alexander, G. E. (1971). "Neuron activity related to short-term memory". Science 173 (3997): 652–654.
- Fuster, J. M.; Jervey, J. P. (1981). "Inferotemporal neurons distinguish and retain behaviorally relevant features of visual stimuli". Science 212 (4497): 952–955.
- Fuster, J. M. (1997). "Network memory". Trends in Neurosciences 20 (10): 451–459.
- Fuster, J. M.; Bodner, M.; Kroger, J. K. (2000). "Cross-modal and cross-temporal association in neurons of frontal cortex". Nature 405 (6784): 347–351.
- Fuster, J. M. (2001). "The prefrontal cortex—an update: time is of the essence". Neuron 30 (2): 319–333.
- Fuster, J. M. (2009). "Cortex and memory: emergence of a new paradigm". Journal of Cognitive Neuroscience 21 (11): 2047–2072.
- Fuster, J. M.; Bressler, S. L. (2012). "Cognit activation: a mechanism enabling temporal integration in working memory". Trends in Cognitive Sciences 16 (4): 207–218.
- Fuster, J. M. (2022). "Cognitive networks (cognits) process and maintain working memory". Frontiers in Neural Circuits 15: 790691.
