= Dorsal nexus =

Area within prefrontal cortex

The dorsal nexus is an area within the dorsal medial prefrontal cortex that serves as an intersection point for multiple brain networks. Research suggests it plays a role in the maintenance and manipulation of information, as well as supporting the control of cognitive functions such as behavior, memory, and conflict resolution. Abnormally increased connectivity between these networks through the dorsal nexus has been associated with certain types of depression. The activity generated by this abnormally high level of connectivity during a depressive state can be identified through magnetic resonance imaging (MRI) and positron emission tomography (PET).

== Anatomy and function ==
The brain's intrinsic connections are divided into different networks that enable communication between the different structures: The cognitive control network, or executive network (EN), the affective network or somatic network, and the default mode network. These regions are dependent on the dorsal nexus to communicate.

The EN is located in the dorsolateral prefrontal cortex and lateral parietal cortex, and is responsible for the maintenance and manipulation of the information in working memory. The EN also plays an important role as support of adaptive, goal-directed behaviors, which is why it is colloquially referred to as "the problem solver."

The affective (or salience) network includes connections between the limbic area and subcortical areas, and is important during fear and vigilance states, as well as for autonomic and visceral regulation. It also generates the somatic sensations that accompany emotions.

The default mode is most active when the brain is at rest, or when a person is communicating socially. Its activity decreases during the performance of cognitively demanding tasks.

== Dorsal nexus and depression ==
Neuroimaging studies have shown that many neurological diseases and psychiatric disorders are associated with abnormalities in the functional connectivity of neural networks. MRIs indicate that the dorsal nexus is responsible for connecting these networks, and this might explain how symptoms of depression are influenced by the state of brain networks. The increased connectivity can produce symptoms of decreased focus and increased vigilance, which can present as paranoia, rumination or autonomic, visceral and emotional imbalance.

Subjects with depression were observed to have abnormal connectivity in the bilateral parahippocampal cortex, as well as an increase of hyperintensity of white matter. Increased default-mode network connectivity, mediated via a region of the dorsomedial prefrontal cortex, may underline the characteristics of depression. In this pathology, the dorsal nexus is strongly connected to the task-positive, task-negative and affective networks. The function of this node is to allow enhanced “cross-talk” between networks, and this may explain how the diverse symptoms seen in depression converge The dorsal nexus can be related to two different types of depression: decreased and major depression. It is important to mention that there is a big difference between these two types: With decreased depression, the connectivity between the cingulated subgenual cortex and amygdala, pale striatum, and medial thalamus is diminished. In the case of major depression, connectivity is normal. This could explain differences in response to drugs and psychotherapy.

== Diagnosis of depression involving dorsal nexus ==
Neuroimaging techniques allow of imaging of the nervous system in vivo, and permit scientists to explore the structures and functions of the human brain. In neuropsychiatry, neuroimaging techniques such as MRI and Positron Emission Tomography allow the identification of different networks that are implicated in various pathologies.

In the case of depression, portions of three different networks (the cognitive control network, the default mode network and the affective network) which are related with conflict resolution, making decisions, behavior, regulate memory and future planning present increased function in MRI's. These three increased connectivity networks converged specifically on the dorsal nexus. The dorsal nexus has extremely high connectivity with large regions including dorso lateral prefrontal cortex, dorso medial prefrontal cortex, ventral medial prefrontal cortex, pregenual an subgenual cortex, posterior cingulate, and precuneus. Because these networks can be determined for each individual based on the strength of correlation to an a priori seed location, group statistical differences in networks can be evaluated on an image – wide basis.

== Treatment ==
Treating the symptoms of depression has the purpose of reduce and control the dysfunction that patients could have in any areas of their life. The choice of treatment is based on the needs of the patient and can include drugs, therapy and other similar treatments. Regardless of the chosen treatment, it is necessary to consider possible side effects. In the case of depression associated with dorsal nexus and other associated structures, reducing the increased connectivity might play a critical role reducing depression symptomatology and thus represent a potential therapy target for affective disorders.

Since glutamate is the most abundant and major excitatory neurotransmitter in the brain, pathophysiological changes in glutamatergic signaling are likely to affect neurobehavioral plasticity, information processing and large-scales changes in functional brain connectivity. Ketamine, a fast-acting general anesthetic derived from phencyclidine and use as a pediatric inductor, plays a non-well known role in the neural network dynamics at the healthy brain. The administration of ketamine in abnormal brain has the potential of reduce the increased function of the networks that are seen in depression. The therapeutic potential of ketamine may be explained by reversing disturbances in the glutamatergic system and restoring parts of a disrupted neurobehavioral homeostasis where several structural, metabolic, and functional abnormalities have taken place. Long term ketamine treatments lead to cognitive impairment including problems of short-term memory, visual and verbal memory. On the other hand, short-term treatments are generally well tolerated and any damage may be reversible.

Electroconvulsive therapy (ECT) significantly reduces functional connectivity between the dorsolateral prefrontal cortex (Dorsal nexus) and the anterior cingulate cortex, the medial prefrontal cortex, and other areas implicated in major depression. Although electroconvulsive therapy has been used as a treatment for depression since 1930, it has several side effects as loss of memory, confusion and difficulties in forming new memories. Because of this reasons, this kind of treatment is limited to severely damaged patients.
