= Brodmann area 25 =

Part of the brain

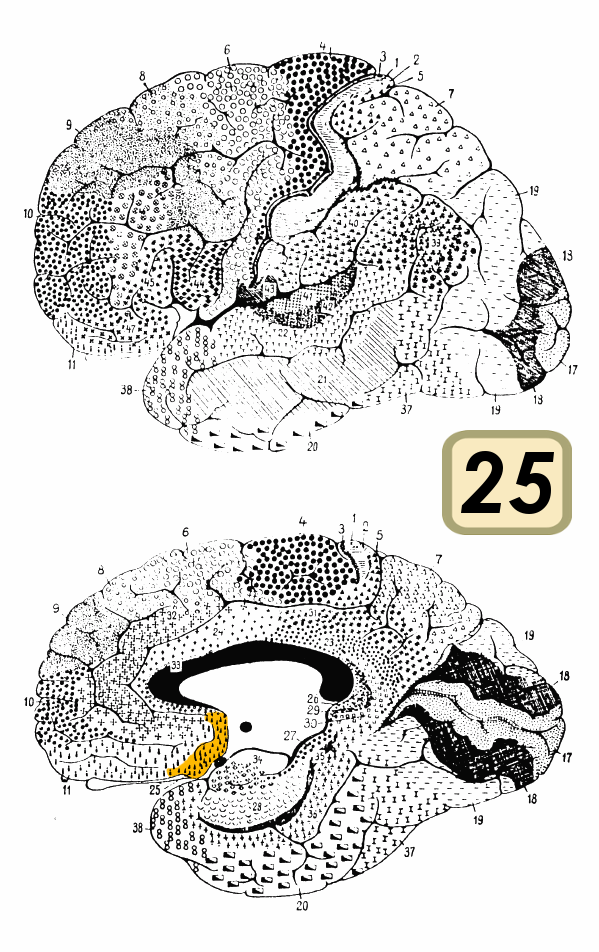
- Brodmann area 25 is shown in orange.

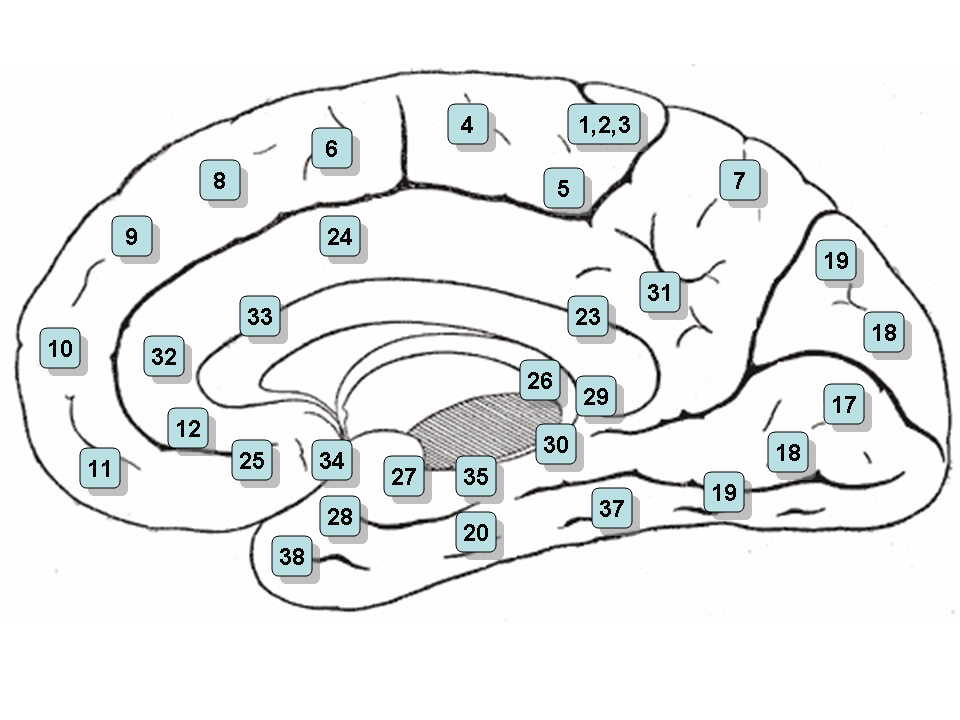
- Medial surface of the brain with Brodmann's areas numbered.

Details

Identifiers
- Latin: area subgenualis
- NeuroNames: 1029
- FMA: 68622

Brodmann area 25 (BA25) is the subgenual area, area subgenualis, or subgenual cingulate area in the cerebral cortex of the brain and delineated based on its cytoarchitectonic characteristics.

It is the 25th "Brodmann area" defined by Korbinian Brodmann. BA25 is located in the cingulate region as a narrow band in the caudal portion of the subcallosal area adjacent to the paraterminal gyrus. The posterior parolfactory sulcus separates the paraterminal gyrus from BA25. Rostrally it is bound by the prefrontal area 11 of Brodmann.

== History ==
Brodmann described this area as it is labeled now in 1909. Originally in 1905, Brodmann labeled the area as part of area 24. In 1909, he divided the area into area 24 and 25.

== Function ==
This region is extremely rich in serotonin transporters and is considered as a governor for a vast network involving areas like hypothalamus and brain stem, which influences changes in appetite and sleep; the amygdala and insula, which affect the mood and anxiety; the hippocampus, which plays an important role in memory formation; and some parts of the frontal cortex responsible for self-esteem. This region is particularly implicated in the normal processing of sadness.

== Involvement in depression ==
The subcallosal cingulate gyrus CG25 which consists of BA25 as well as parts of BA24 and BA32 has been implicated as playing an important role in major depressive disorder (MDD) and has been the target of deep brain stimulation to treat the disorder.

One study found that BA25 is metabolically overactive in treatment-resistant depression. A different study found that metabolic hyperactivity in this area is associated with poor therapeutic response of persons with MDD to cognitive behavioral therapy and venlafaxine.

In 2005 Helen S. Mayberg and collaborators described how they successfully treated a number of depressed people—individuals virtually catatonic with depression despite years of talk therapy, drugs, and electroconvulsive therapy—with pacemaker-like electrodes (deep brain stimulation) in area 25.

In 2013, Walker and Lawson conducted neurofeedback research with 183 subjects experiencing drug resistant depression. The neurofeedback specifically targeted Brodmann area 25. The treatment consisted of 6 neurofeedback sessions that were 20 minutes long each over the course of 3 weeks. 1 year after the treatment 84% of subjects experienced over a 50% reduction in depression symptoms. 9% reported a 20–50% reduction in depression symptoms. 7% reported a 0–20% improvement. 1% initially reported positive effects, but had a depression relapse before the year follow up completed. There were no side effects or complications reported from the treatment.

A study found that transcranial magnetic stimulation is more clinically effective treating depression when targeted specifically to Brodmann area 46, because this area has intrinsic functional connectivity (negative correlation) with area 25.

Another study has found that the responses of area 25 to viewing sad stimuli are affected by cortisol. This suggests that depression related changes in the activity in area 25 could be due to hypothalamic–pituitary–adrenal axis dysregulation.

== Image ==
Animation.

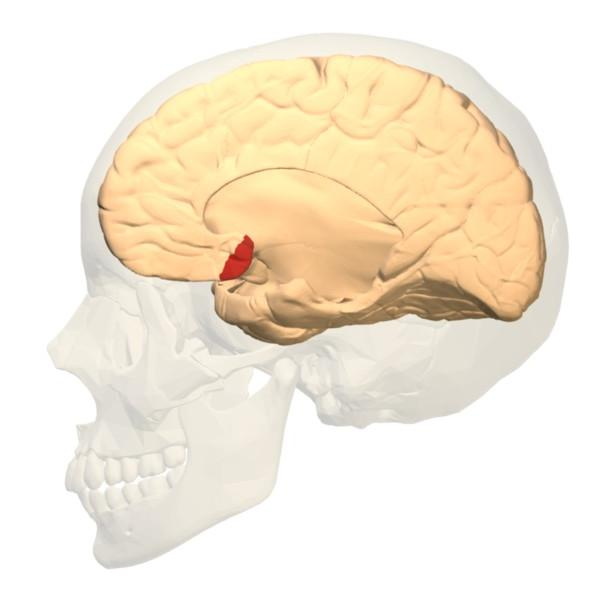
Medial view.

== See also ==
- Brodmann area
- List of regions in the human brain
- Biology of depression
