= Self-model =

Central concept of the self-model theory of subjectivity

The self-model is the central concept in the theory of consciousness called the self-model theory of subjectivity (SMT). This concept comprises experiences of ownership, of first person perspective, and of a long-term unity of beliefs and attitudes. These features are instantiated in the prefrontal cortex. This theory is an interdisciplinary approach to understanding and explaining the phenomenology of consciousness and the self. This theory has two core contents, the phenomenal self-model (PSM) and the phenomenal model of the intentionality relation (PMIR). The philosopher Thomas Metzinger advanced the theory in his 1993 book Subjekt und Selbstmodell (Subject and self-model), and it is the basis of his book Being No One: The Self-Model Theory of Subjectivity.

== Overview of the phenomenal self-model ==
Metzinger states that the PSM is an entity that "actually exists, not only as a distinct theoretical entity but something that will be empirically discovered in the future—for instance, as a specific stage of the global neural dynamics in the human brain". Involved in the PSM are three phenomenal properties that must occur in order to explain the concept of the self. The first is mineness, "a higher order property of particular forms of phenomenal content," or the idea of ownership. The second is perspectivalness, which is "a global, structural property of phenomenal space as a whole". More simply, it is what is commonly referred to as the ecological self, the immovable center of perception. The third phenomenal property is selfhood, which is "the phenomenal target property" or the idea of the self over time. It is the property of phenomenal selfhood that plays the most important role in creating the fictional self and the first person perspective.

Metzinger defines the first-person perspective as the "existence of single coherent and temporally stable model of reality which is representationally centered around or on a single coherent and temporally stable phenomenal subject". The first-person perspective can be non-conceptual and is autonomously active due to the constant reception of perceptual information by the brain. The brain, specifically the brainstem and hypothalamus, processes this information into representational content, namely linguistic reflections. The PSM then uses this representational content to attribute phenomenal states to self and to perceived objects.

People are thus what Metzinger calls naïve realists, who believe they are perceiving reality directly when in actuality they are only perceiving representations of reality. The data structures and transport mechanisms of the data are "transparent" so that people can introspect on their representations of perceptions, but cannot introspect on the data or mechanisms themselves. These systemic representational experiences are then connected by subjective experience to generate the phenomenal property of selfhood.

Subjective experience is the result of the phenomenal model of intentionality relationship (PMIR). The PMIR is a "conscious mental model, and its content is an ongoing, episodic subject-object relation". The model is a result of the combination of a unique set of sensory receptors that acquire input, a unique set of experiences that shape connections within the brain, and unique positions in space that give a person's perception perspectivalness.

== Role of the prefrontal cortex ==
The prefrontal cortex is implicated in all the functions of the human self-model. The following functions all require communication with the prefrontal cortex; agency and association areas of the cortex; spatial perspectivity and the parietal lobes, unity and the temporal lobes.

== Relation to psychopathology ==
Disorders of the self-model are implicated in several disorders including schizophrenia, autism, and depersonalization. According to this theory, long-term unity is impaired in autism, similar to theory of mind deficits and weak central coherence theory. Individuals with autism are thought to be impaired in assigning mental states to other people, an ability that probably codevelops with long-term unity of self. Weak central coherence, that is, the inability to assemble information into a cohesive whole, reflects the same problems with creating a unified sense of self and benefic sense extreme in narcissism.
