= External granular layer (cerebral cortex) =

Details

Identifiers
- Latin: lamina granularis externa isocorticis
- TA98: A14.1.09.310
- FMA: 242264

The external granular layer of the cerebral cortex is commonly known as layer II. It is different from the internal granular layer of the cerebral cortex (commonly known as layer IV).

Layer II is often grouped together with layer III and referred to as layer II/III.

Layers I, II, and III are together referred to as the supragranular layers, because they are above layer IV.

Brodmann has this to say about layer II:

"The most inconstant or variable layers are Meynert's two so-called granular layers, layers II and IV of the basic pattern (the outer and inner granular layers). They alter their original cytoarchitectonic features so extensively during ontogeny that it is often only possible to correlate their mature structure with their primitive tectogenetic form by following the whole developmental sequence. Extreme variation, such as the disappearance or doubling of layers that we have already discussed, occur particularly in them, and their specific organisation also varies widely throughout the mammalian class, as we shall see.

The outer granular layer (layer II) is a major layer of the basic tectogenetic pattern, present over the whole extent of the cortex during foetal life and infancy. It stands out clearly as a thick, compact cellular lamina deep to the cell-spare molecular layer layers, as can be observed in Figures 1 to 3, 8 to 11 and 13 to 15 from man, cat, and wallaby (*69). ... As the individual grows older, the layer regresses and its essential transformation consists of its disappearance as an independent structure and its more or less complete fusion with the underlying pyramidal layer in most cortical areas of the mature brain.... The outer granular layer maintains its independent character as a separate layer only in relatively few regions, where it represents a strip of densely packed, small polymorphic cells deep to the molecular layer, distinguished from the actual pyramidal layer by the density and small size of these cells. ... "

== See also ==
- Internal granular layer
- External granular layer
