= Brodmann area 33 =

Brain area in the cingulate cortex

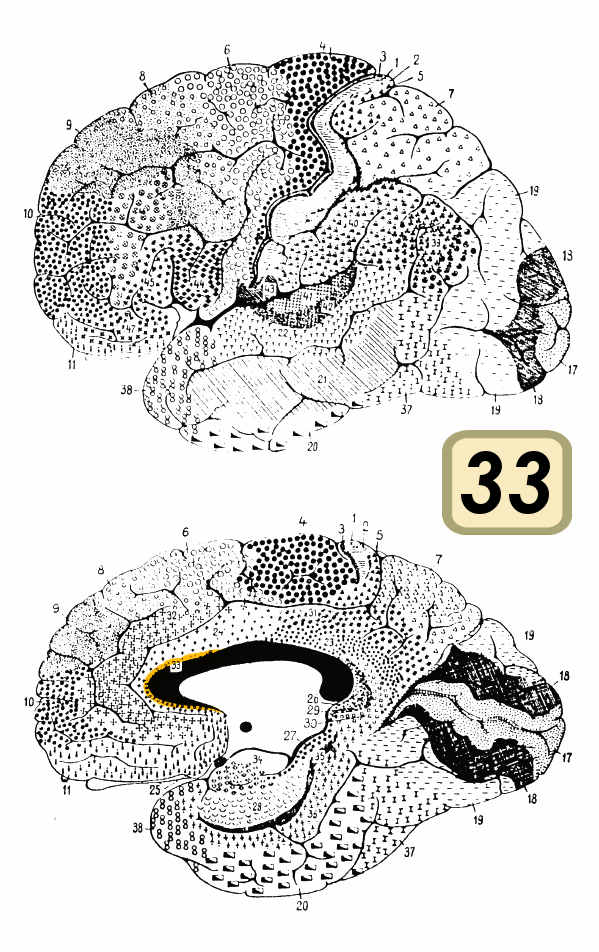
- Brodmann area 33 (shown in orange)

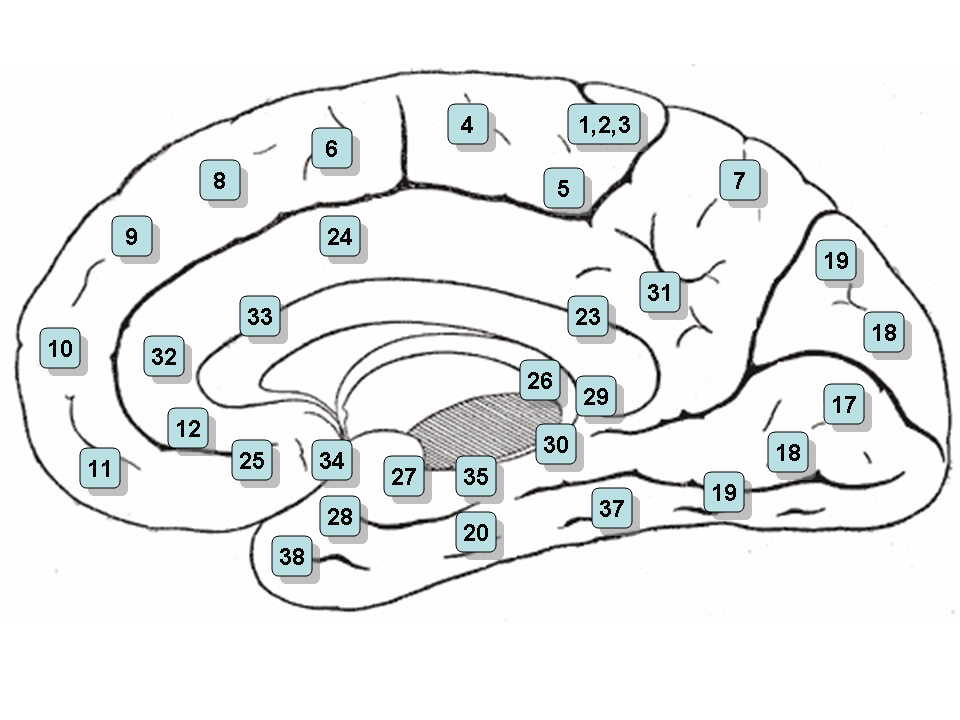
- Medial surface of the brain with Brodmann's areas numbered.

Details

Identifiers
- Latin: area praegenualis
- NeuroLex ID: birnlex_1766
- FMA: 68630

Brodmann area 33, also known as pregenual area 33, is a subdivision of the cytoarchitecturally defined cingulate region of cerebral cortex. It is a narrow band located in the anterior cingulate gyrus adjacent to the supracallosal gyrus in the depth of the callosal sulcus, near the genu of the corpus callosum. Cytoarchitecturally it is bounded by the ventral anterior cingulate area 24 and the supracallosal gyrus (Brodmann-1909). The pregenual area 33 is heavily involved in emotions, especially happy emotions.

== Image ==
Animation.

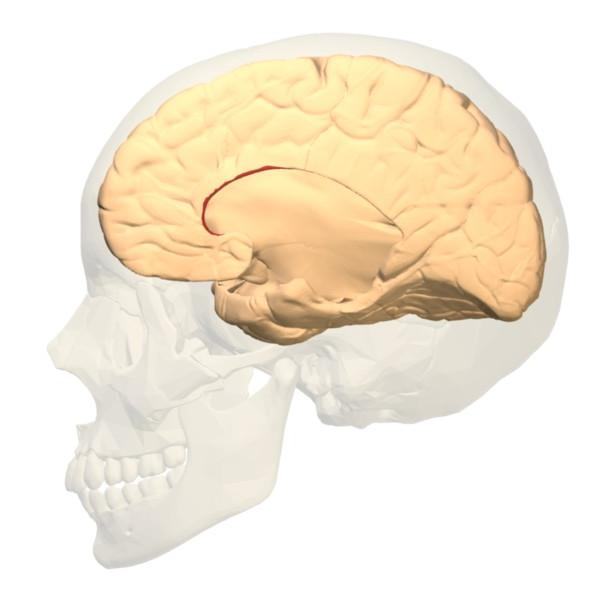
Medial view.

== See also ==
- Brodmann area
