= Brodmann area 13 =

Brain area

Area 13 (Brain)
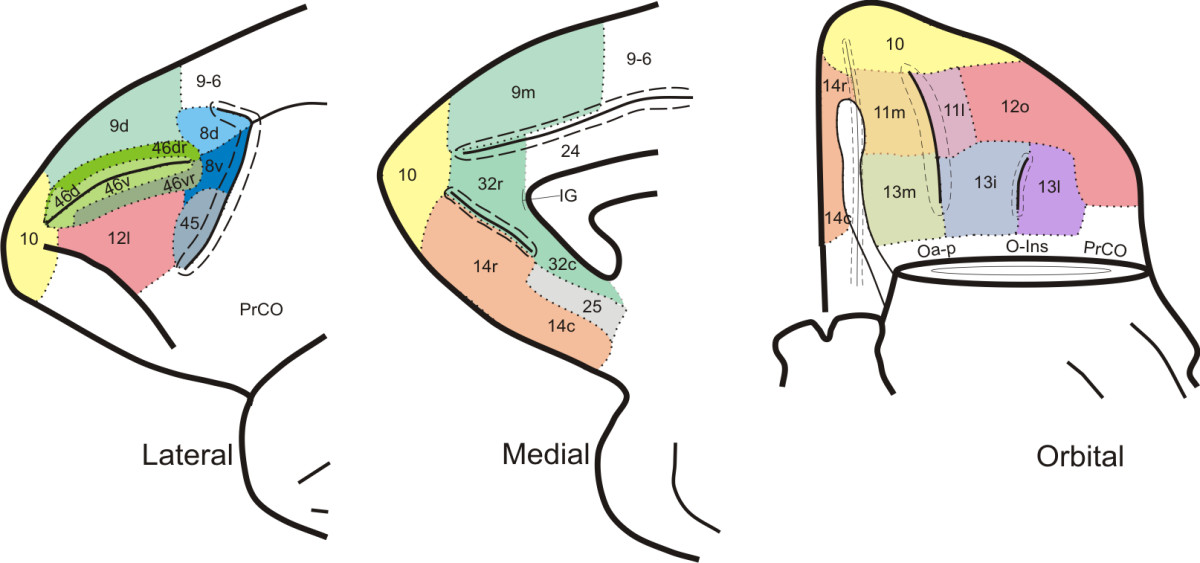
- Frontal cortex of Sapajus sp. BA13 is shown in the diagram at right (orbital surface).

Identifiers
- NeuroNames: 1009
- NeuroLex ID: birnlex_1744
- FMA: 68610

Area 13 is part of the Orbitofrontal cortex, a subdivision of the cerebral cortex as defined by cytoarchitecture.

== Location ==
Area 13 is located in the posterior part of the Orbitofrontal cortex, and can be subdivided into areas 13a, 13b, 13m, 13l. Area 13a is anterior to the junction of olfactory tract and area 13b occupies a region just anterior to 13a along the olfactory sulcus. Area 13m is on the medial part of the middle orbital gyrus, whereas 13l is in the lateral part of the gyrus.

== Subregions ==
Areas 13m and 13l are dysgranular regions of cortex. These areas are differentiated from the more anterior area 11 by a lack of continuous granular layer, and from the more posterior agranular Insular cortex. Area 13b is a thin and dysgranular cortical area, often characterized by crossing patterns of striations in layers III and V. Area 13a has an agranular structure.

== See also ==
- Brodmann areas
- List of regions in the human brain
