= Brodmann area 11 =

Brain area

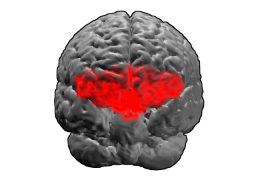
- Image of brain with Brodmann area 11 shown in red

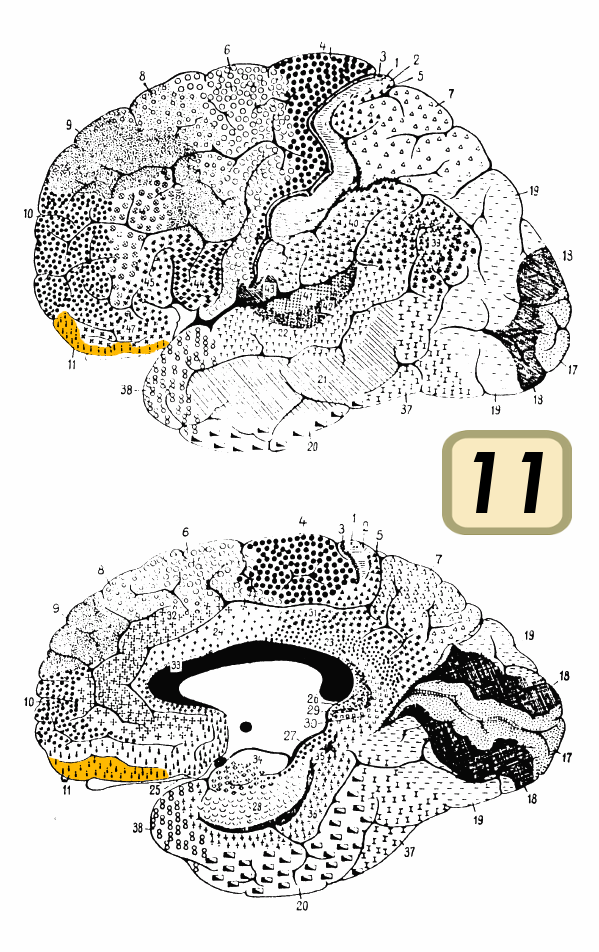

Identifiers
- NeuroNames: 1036
- NeuroLex ID: birnlex_1742
- FMA: 68608

Brodmann area 11 is one of Brodmann's cytologically defined regions of the brain. It is in the orbitofrontal cortex which is above the eye sockets (orbitae). It is involved in decision making, processing rewards, and encoding new information into long-term memory.

== In humans ==
Brodmann area 11, or BA11, is part of the frontal cortex in the human brain. BA11 is the part of the orbitofrontal cortex that covers the medial portion of the ventral surface of the frontal lobe.

Prefrontal area 11 of Brodmann-1909 is a subdivision of the frontal lobe in the human defined on the basis of cytoarchitecture. Defined and illustrated in Brodmann-1909, it included the areas subsequently illustrated in Brodmann-10 as prefrontal area 11 and rostral area 12.

Area 11 is a subdivision of the cytoarchitecturally defined frontal region of cerebral cortex of the human. As illustrated in Brodmann-10, It constitutes most of the orbital gyri, gyrus rectus and the most rostral portion of the superior frontal gyrus. It is bounded medially by the inferior rostral sulcus (H) and laterally approximately by the frontomarginal sulcus (H). Cytoarchitecturally it is bounded on the rostral and lateral aspects of the hemisphere by the frontopolar area 10, the orbital area 47, and the triangular area 45; on the medial surface it is bounded dorsally by the rostral area 12 and caudally by the subgenual area 25. In an earlier map, the area labeled 11, i.e., prefrontal area 11 of Brodmann-1909, was larger; it included the area now designated rostral area 12.

== In guenon monkeys ==
Brodmann area 11 is a subdivision of the frontal lobe of the guenon monkey defined on the basis of cytoarchitecture (Brodmann-1905). Distinctive features: area 11 lacks an internal granular layer (IV); larger pyramidal cells of sublayer 3b of the external pyramidal layer (III) merge with a denser self-contained collection of cells in the internal pyramidal layer (V); similar to area 10 of Brodmann-1909 is the presence in the multiform layer (VI) of trains of cells oriented parallel to the cortical surface separated by acellular fiber bundles; a thick molecular layer (I); a relatively narrow overall cortical thickness; and a gradual transition from the multiform layer (VI) to the subcortical white matter.

== Images ==
Animation.

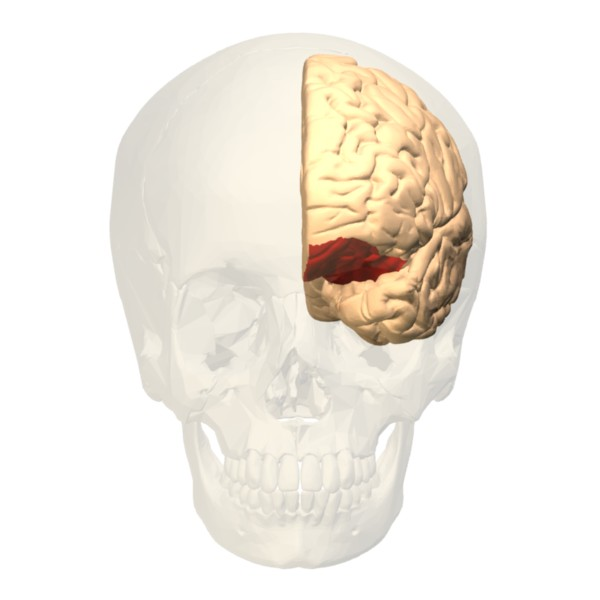
front view.

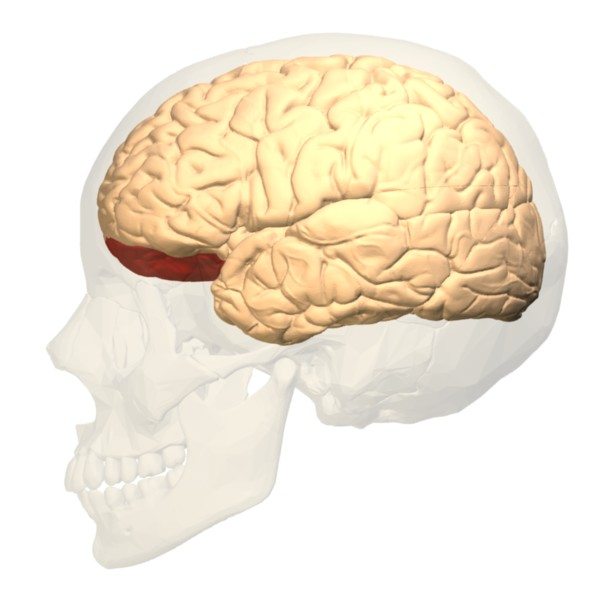
Lateral view.

== See also ==
- Brodmann area
- List of regions in the human brain
