= Brodmann area 8 =

Brain area

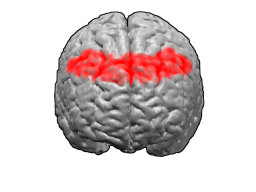
- Image of brain with Brodmann area 8 shown in red

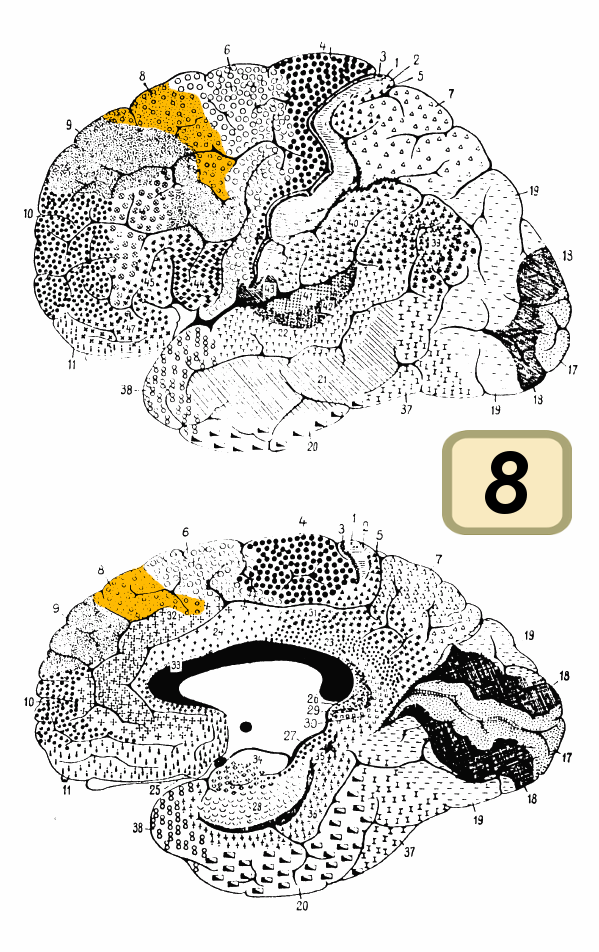
- Image of brain with Brodmann area 8 shown in orange

Details

Identifiers
- Latin: area frontalis intermedia
- NeuroNames: 1034
- NeuroLex ID: birnlex_1739
- FMA: 68605

Lateral surface of the brain with Brodmann's areas numbered. (8 is labeled in upper left.)

Brodmann area 8 is one of Brodmann's cytologically defined regions of the brain. It is involved in planning complex movements.

== Human ==
Brodmann area 8, or BA8, is part of the frontal cortex in the human brain. Situated just anterior to the premotor cortex (BA6), it includes the frontal eye fields (so-named because they are believed to play an important role in the control of eye movements). Damage to this area, by stroke, trauma or infection, causes tonic deviation of the eyes towards the side of the injury. This finding occurs during the first few hours of an acute event such as cerebrovascular infarct (stroke) or hemorrhage (bleeding).

== Guenon ==
The term Brodmann area 8 refers to a cytoarchitecturally defined portion of the frontal lobe of the guenon. Located rostral to the arcuate sulcus, it was not considered by Brodmann-1909 to be topographically homologous to the intermediate frontal area 8 of the human.

Distinctive features (Brodmann-1905): compared to Brodmann area 6-1909, area 8 has a diffuse but clearly present internal granular layer (IV); sublayer 3b of the external pyramidal layer (III) has densely distributed medium-sized pyramidal cells; the internal pyramidal layer (V) has larger ganglion cells densely distributed with some granule cells interspersed; the external granular layer (II) is denser and broader; cell layers are more distinct; the abundance of cells is somewhat greater.

== Functions ==
The area is involved in eye movements and possibly in the management of uncertainty. A functional magnetic resonance imaging study demonstrated that Brodmann area 8 activation occurs when test subjects experience uncertainty, and that with increasing uncertainty there is increasing activation.

An alternative interpretation is that this activation in the frontal cortex encodes hope, a higher-order expectation positively correlated with uncertainty.

== Image ==
Animation.

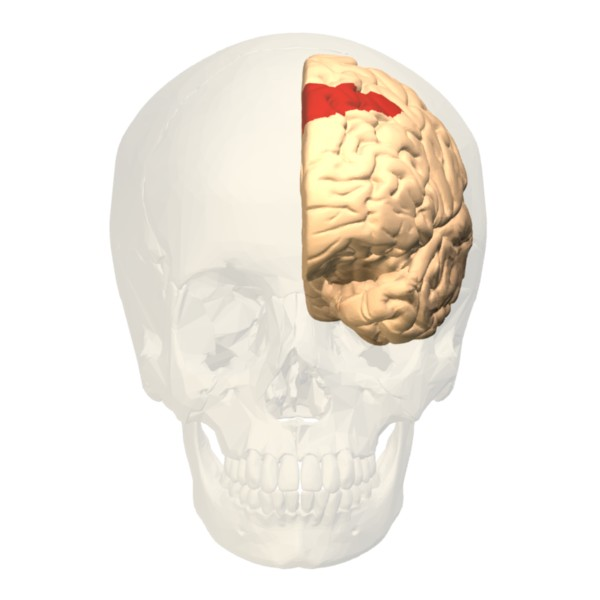
front view.

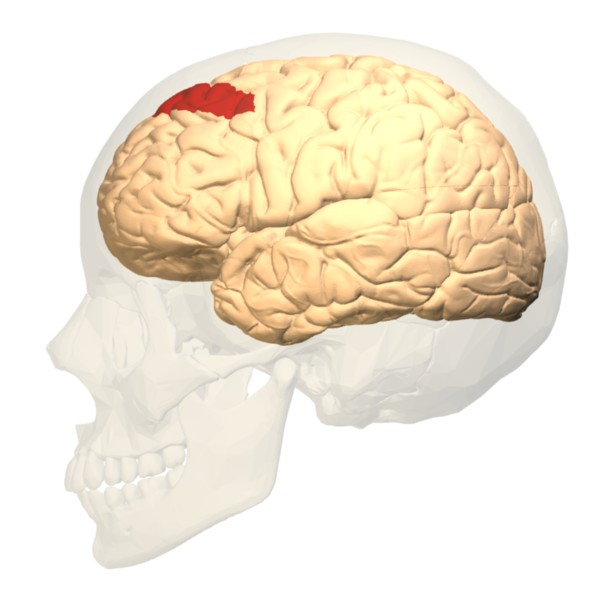
Lateral view.

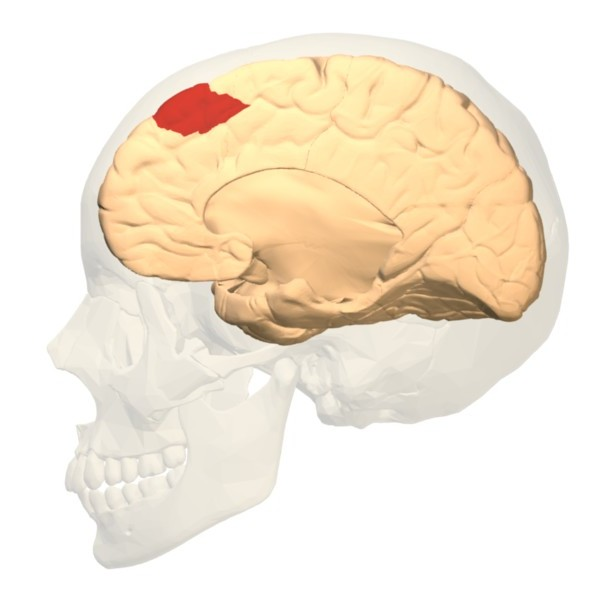
Medial view.

== See also ==
- Brodmann area
- List of regions in the human brain
