= Brodmann area 6 =

Brain region

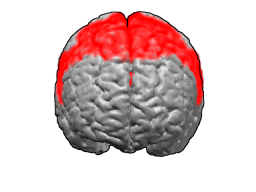

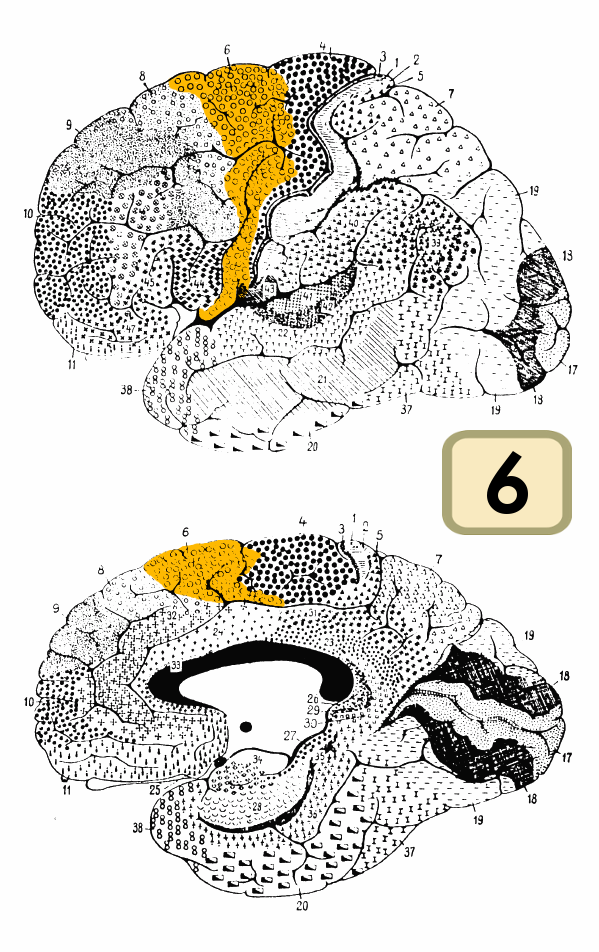

Details

Identifiers
- Latin: area frontalis agranularis
- NeuroNames: 1020
- NeuroLex ID: birnlex_1737
- FMA: 68602

Brodmann area 6 (BA6) is part of the frontal cortex in the human brain. It is one of the Brodmann areas. Situated just anterior to the primary motor cortex (BA4), it is composed of the premotor cortex and, medially, the supplementary motor area (SMA). This large area of the frontal cortex is believed to play a role in planning complex, coordinated movements.

Brodmann area 6 is also called agranular frontal area 6 in humans because it lacks an internal granular cortical layer (layer IV). It is a subdivision of the cytoarchitecturally defined precentral region of cerebral cortex. In the human brain, it is located on the portions of the precentral gyrus that are not occupied by Brodmann area 4; furthermore, BA6 extends onto the caudal portions of the superior frontal and middle frontal gyri. It extends from the cingulate sulcus on the medial aspect of the hemisphere to the lateral sulcus on the lateral aspect. It is bounded rostrally by the granular frontal region and caudally by the gigantopyramidal area 4 (Brodmann, 1909).

== Other animals ==
Brodmann area 6 is a cytoarchitecturally defined portion of the frontal lobe of the guenon. Brodmann-1909 regarded it as topographically and cytoarchitecturally homologous to the human agranular frontal area 6 and noted that, in the monkey, area 4 is larger than area 6, whereas, in the human, area 6 is larger than area 4. Distinctive features (Brodmann-1905): It is thick relative to other cortical areas; the transition from cortex to subcortical white matter is gradual; cell layers are indistinct; and the internal granular layer (IV) is absent.

== Image ==
Animation.

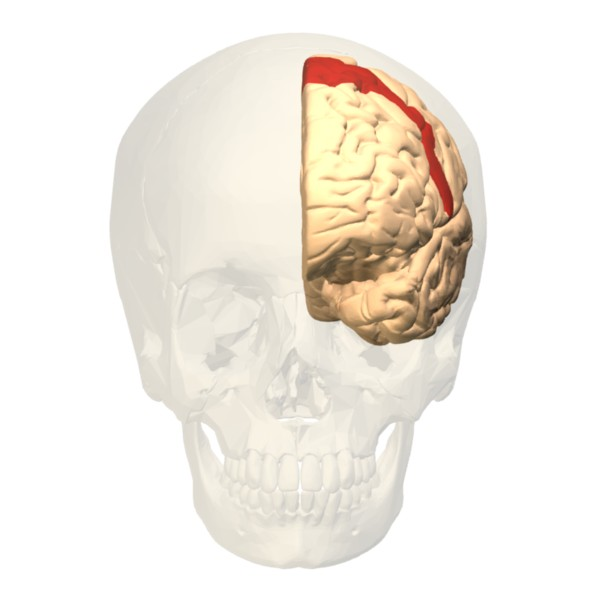
front view.

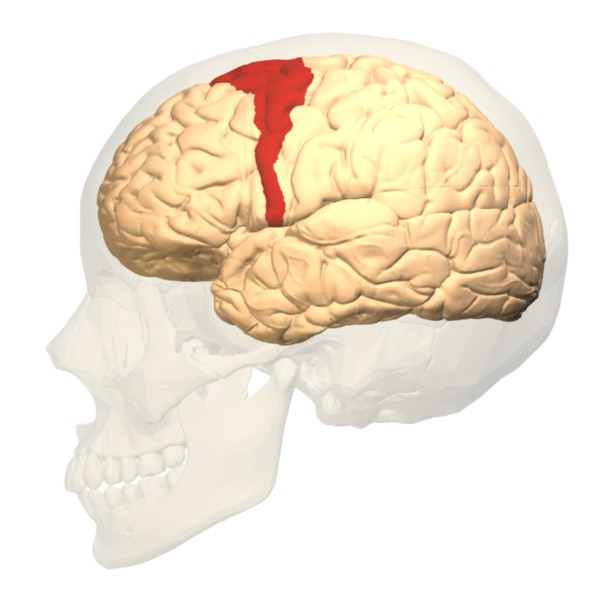
Lateral view.

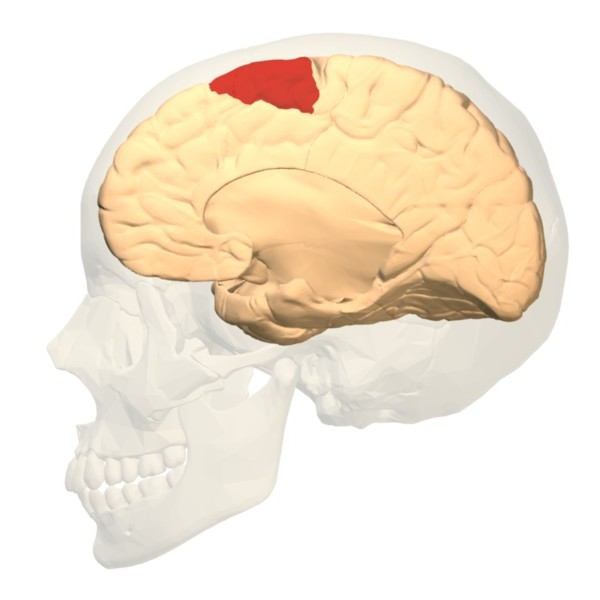
Medial view.

== See also ==
- Brodmann area
- List of regions in the human brain
- Korbinian Brodmann
