= Internal granular layer (cerebral cortex) =

Details

Identifiers
- Latin: lamina granularis interna
- TA98: A14.1.09.312
- FMA: 77811

The internal granular layer of the cerebral cortex, also commonly referred to as the granular layer of the cortex, is layer IV of 6 layers in the subdivision of the mammalian cerebral cortex. The adjective internal is used in opposition to the external granular layer of the cortex, the term granular refers to the granule cells found here.

This layer receives the afferent connections from the thalamus and from other cortical regions and sends connections to the other layers. The line of Gennari (occipital stripe) is also present in this layer.

== See also ==
- Granular layer
- External granular layer (cerebral cortex)
