= Language center =

Speech processing areas of the brain

Language areas of the brain. The angular gyrus is represented in orange, the supramarginal gyrus is represented in yellow, Broca's area in blue, Wernicke's area in green, and the primary auditory cortex in pink.

In neuroscience and psychology, the term language center refers collectively to the areas of the brain which serve a particular function for speech processing and production. Language is a core system that gives humans the capacity to solve difficult problems and provides them with a unique type of social interaction. Language allows individuals to attribute symbols (e.g. words or signs) to specific concepts, and utilize them through sentences and phrases that follow proper grammatical rules. Finally, speech is the mechanism by which language is orally expressed.

Information is exchanged in a larger system, including language-related regions. These regions are connected by white matter fiber tracts that make possible the transmission of information between regions. The white matter fiber bunches were recognized to be important for language production after suggesting that it is possible to make a connection between multiple language centers. The three classical language areas that are involved in language production and processing are Broca's and Wernicke's areas, and the angular gyrus.

== Broca's area ==
Broca's Area was first suggested to play a role in speech function by the French neurologist and anthropologist Paul Broca in 1861. The basis for this discovery was analyzing speech problems resulting from injuries to this brain region, located in the inferior frontal gyrus. Paul Broca had a patient called Leborgne who could only pronounce the word "tan" when speaking. After working with another patient with a similar impairment, Paul Broca concluded that damage in the inferior frontal gyrus affected articulate language.

Broca's area is well known for being the syntactic processing "center". It has been known of since Paul Broca associated speech production with an area in the posterior inferior frontal gyrus, which he called "Broca's area". Although this area is in charge of speech production, the specific details of its role in the language system is unknown. However, it is involved in phonological, semantic, and syntactic processing, and working memory. The anterior region of Broca's area is involved in semantic processing, while the posterior region involves phonological processing (Bohsali, 2015). The whole of Broca's area has been shown to have a higher activation while doing reading tasks than other types of tasks.

In a simple explanation of speech production, this area approaches phonological word representation chronologically divided into segments of syllables which then is sent to different motor areas where they are converted into a phonetic code. The study of how this area produces speech has been made with paradigms using both single and complex words.

Broca's area is correlated with phonological segmentation, unification, and syntactic processing, all connected to linguistic information. This area, although it synchronizes the transformation of information within cortical systems involved in spoken word production, does not contribute to the production of single words. The inferior frontal lobe is the one in charge of word production.

Furthermore, Broca's area is structurally related to the thalamus, and both are engaged in language processing. The connectivity between both areas is two thalamic nuclei, the pulvinar, and the ventral nucleus, which are involved in language processing and linguistic functions similar to BA 44 and 45 in Broca's area. Pulvinar is connected to many frontal regions of the frontal cortex and the ventral nucleus is involved in speech production. The frontal speech regions of the brain have been shown to participate in speech sound perception.

Broca's Area is today still considered an important language center, playing a central role in processing syntax, grammar, and sentence structure.

== Wernicke's area ==
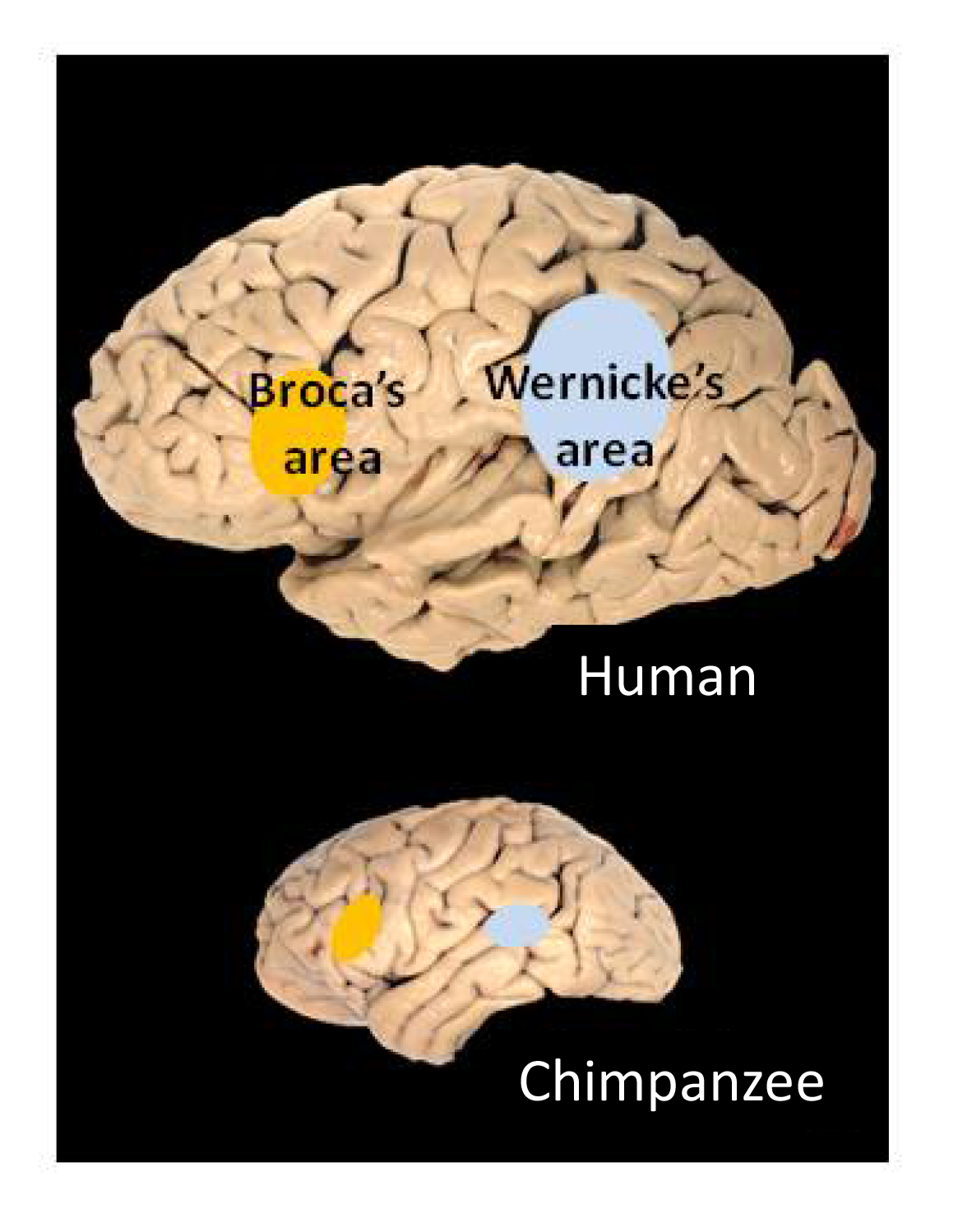
Broca's and Wernicke's areas.

Wernicke's area was named for German doctor Carl Wernicke, who discovered it in 1874 in the course of his research into aphasias (loss of ability to speak). This area of the brain is involved in language comprehension. Therefore, Wernicke's area is for understanding oral language. Besides Wernicke's area, the left posterior superior temporal gyrus (pSTG), middle temporal gyrus (MTG), inferior temporal gyrus (ITG), supramarginal gyrus (SMG), and angular gyrus (AG) participate in language comprehension. Therefore, language comprehension is not located in a specific area. Contrarily, it involves large regions of the inferior parietal lobe and left temporal.

While the finale of speech production is a sequence of muscle movements, activating knowledge about the sequence of phonemes (consonants and vowel speech sounds) that creates a word is a phonological retrieval. Wernicke's area contributes to phonological retrieval. All speech production tasks (e.g. word retrieval, repetition, and reading aloud) require phonological retrieval. The phonological retrieval system involved in speech repetition is the auditory phoneme perception system, and the visual letter perception system is the one that serves for reading aloud. Communicative speech production entails a phase preceding phonological retrieval. Speech comprehension involves mapping sequences of phonemes onto word meaning.

== Angular gyrus (Inferior parietal lobule) ==
The angular gyrus is important in processing concrete and abstract concepts. It also has a role in verbal working memory during retrieval of verbal information and in visual memory when turning written language into spoken language. The left AG is activated in semantic processing that requires concept retrieval and conceptual integration. Also, the left AG is activated during problems of multiplication and addition requiring return of arithmetic factors in verbal memory. Thus, it is involved in verbal coding of numbers.

== Insular cortex ==
The insula is implicated in speech and language, taking part in functional and structural connections with motor neurons, linguistic, sensory, and limbic brain areas. The knowledge about the function of the insula in speech production comes from different studies with patients having speech apraxia. These studies have led researchers to learn of the involvement of different parts of the insula. These parts are the left anterior insula, which is related to speech production, and the bilateral anterior insula, which is involved in misleading speech comprehension.

== Speech and language disorders ==
Many different sources state that the study of the brain, and therefore, language disorders, originated in the 19th century, and linguistic analysis of those disorders began in the 20th century. Studying language impairments in the brain after injuries aids in comprehending how the brain works and changes after an injury. When this happens, the brain's impairment is referred to as "aphasia". Lesions to Broca's Area results primarily in disruptions to speech production; damage to Wernicke's Area, which is located in the lower part of the temporal lobe, leads mainly to disruptions in speech reception.

There are numerous distinctive ways in which language can be affected. Phonemic paraphasia, an attribute of conduction aphasia and Wernicke aphasia, does not involve speech comprehension impairment. Instead, it requires speech production damage, where the desired phonemes are selected erroneously or in an incorrect sequence. Therefore, although Wernicke's aphasia, a combination of phonological retrieval and semantic systems impairment, affects speech comprehension, it also involves speech production damage. Phonemic paraphasia and anomia (impaired word retrieval) are the results of phonological retrieval impairment.

Another lesion that involves impairment in language production and processing is apraxia of speech, a difficulty synchronizing articulators essential for speech production. This type of lesion is located in the superior pre-central gyrus of the insula, and is more likely to occur in patients with Broca's aphasia. Lesions of the dominant ventral anterior nucleus may result in semantic paraphasias and difficulty in word-finding. Also, individuals with thalamic lesions experience difficulties linking semantic concepts with correct phonological representations in word production.

Dyslexia is a language-processing disorder. It involves learning difficulties in reading, writing, word recognition, phonological recording, numeracy, and spelling. Even with access to appropriate intervention during childhood, these difficulties continue throughout the lifespan. Children are diagnosed with dyslexia when more than one factor affecting learning (e.g. reading or writing) appears. When children diagnosed with dyslexia have difficulties in concrete cognitive functioning, this is called an assumption of specificity, and it aids in the diagnosis of dyslexia.

Some characteristics that distinguish dyslexics include errors in phonological processing, causing misreading of unfamiliar words, affecting comprehension; inadequacy of working memory, affecting speaking, reading, and writing; errors in oral reading; oral skill difficulties such as expressing oneself; and writing skill problems in areas such as spelling and general expression. Dyslexics not only experience learning difficulties, but also other secondary characteristics, such as having difficulties in organizing, planning, social interaction, motor skills, visual perception, and short-term memory. These characteristics affect personal and academic life.

Dysarthria is a motor speech disorder caused by damage to the central and/or peripheral nervous system, and it is related to degenerative neurological diseases, such as Parkinson's disease, cerebrovascular accident (CVA), and traumatic brain injury (TBI). Dysarthria can be caused by a mechanical difficulty in the vocal cords, or neurological disease, and produces abnormal articulation of phonemes, such as using "b" in place of "p". Apraxic dysarthria is a type of dyspraxia that involves distortions of words. This type is related to facial apraxia and motor aphasia if Broca's area is involved.

== Current scientific consensus ==
Improvement in computer technology in the late 20th century has allowed a better understanding of the correlation between brain and language, in the disorders that this entails. This improvement has permitted better visualization of the brain structure in high-resolution three-dimensional images. It has also allowed observation of brain activity through blood flow (Dronkers, Ivanova, & Baldo, 2017).

New medical imaging techniques such as PET and fMRI have allowed researchers to generate pictures showing which areas of a living brain are active at a given time. Functional magnetic resonance imaging (fMRI) localizes specific brain functions to particular brain regions by observing blood flow in different areas. This technique shows the location and magnitude of neural activity variations, influenced by external stimulation and fluctuation at rest. MRI is a technique that was developed in the 20th century to observe brain activity in healthy and abnormal brains. Diffusion-weighted magnetic resonance imaging, or diffusion tensor imaging (DTI), is a technique used for tracking white matter bundles in vivo, and gives information on the internal fibrous structure via measuring water diffusion. This diffusion tensor is used for inferring white matter connectivity.

In the past, research was primarily based on observations of loss of ability resulting from damage to the cerebral cortex. In the modern era, medical imaging has represented a radical step forward for research on speech processing. It is now known that a whole series of relatively large brain areas are involved in speech processing. In more recent research, subcortical regions (those lying below the cerebral cortex such as the putamen and the caudate nucleus), as well as the pre-motor areas (BA 6), have received increased attention. Cortical and subcortical structures such as the dorsolateral prefrontal cortex (DLPFC), supplementary motor area (SMA), visual word form area (VWFA), superior parietal lobule (SPL), inferior parietal lobule (IPL), ventral premotor cortex (vPMC), and cerebellum have been shown to be involved in language processing and act as secondary language structures. It is now generally assumed that the following structures of the cerebral cortex near the primary and secondary auditory cortices play a fundamental role in speech processing:

- Superior temporal gyrus (STG): morphosyntactic processing (anterior section), integration of syntactic and semantic information (posterior section, Wernicke's area)
- Inferior frontal gyrus (IFG, Brodmann area (BA) 45/47): syntactic processing, working memory
- Inferior frontal gyrus (IFG, BA 44, Broca's area): syntactic processing, working memory
- Middle temporal gyrus (MTG): lexical semantic processing
- Angular gyrus (AG) (Inferior parietal lobule (IPL)): semantic processes (posterior temporal cortex)

The left hemisphere is usually dominant in right-handed people, although bilateral activations are not uncommon in syntactic processing. It is now accepted that the right hemisphere plays an important role in the processing of suprasegmental acoustic features like prosody, which is "the rhythmic and melodic variations in speech". There are two types of prosodic information: emotional prosody (right hemisphere), which is the emotional content of the speech, and linguistic prosody (left hemisphere), the syntactic and thematic structure of the speech.

Most areas of speech processing develop in the second year of life in the dominant half (hemisphere) of the brain, which often (though not necessarily) corresponds to the opposite of the dominant hand. 98% of right-handed people are left-hemisphere dominant, and the majority of left-handed people are as well.

Computerized tomographic (CT) scans are a technique dating to the 1970s, and produce low spatial resolution, but are capable of providing the location of injuries in vivo. Also, Voxel-based Lesion Symptom Mapping (VLSM) and Voxel-Based Morphometry (VBM) techniques have contributed to the understanding that specific brain regions have different roles when supporting speech processing. VLSM has been used to observe complex language functions supported by multiple brain regions. VBM is a helpful technique for analyzing language impairments related to neurodegenerative disease.

== Older models ==
The classical model of language neurobiology, which emphasized Broca's and Wernicke's areas, has been challenged by modern research and is considered inadequate as a complete model of language processing.Broca's area was first suggested to play a role in speech function by the French neurologist and anthropologist Paul Broca in 1861. The basis for this discovery was the analysis of speech problems resulting from injuries to this brain region, located in the inferior frontal gyrus. Lesions to Broca's Area result primarily in disruptions to speech production.

Damage to Wernicke's area, located in the lower part of the temporal lobe, mainly leads to speech reception disruptions. This area was named for German doctor Carl Wernicke, who discovered it in 1874 in the course of his research into aphasias (loss of ability to speak).

Broca's area is today still considered an important language center, playing a central role in processing syntax, grammar, and sentence structure.

== See also ==
- Language module
