= Ventrolateral prefrontal cortex =

Part of the prefrontal cortex of the brain

Details

Identifiers
- Latin: cortex praefrontalis ventrolateralis
- Acronym(s): VLPFC

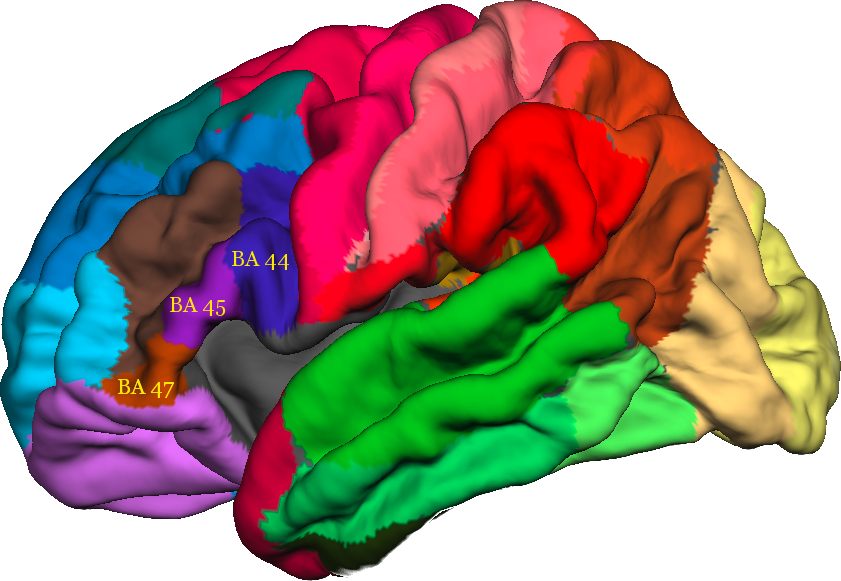
Human brain, left hemisphere. The Brodmann areas 47. 45. 44 are presented, which correspond to the VLPFC (according to this FreeSurfer atlas).

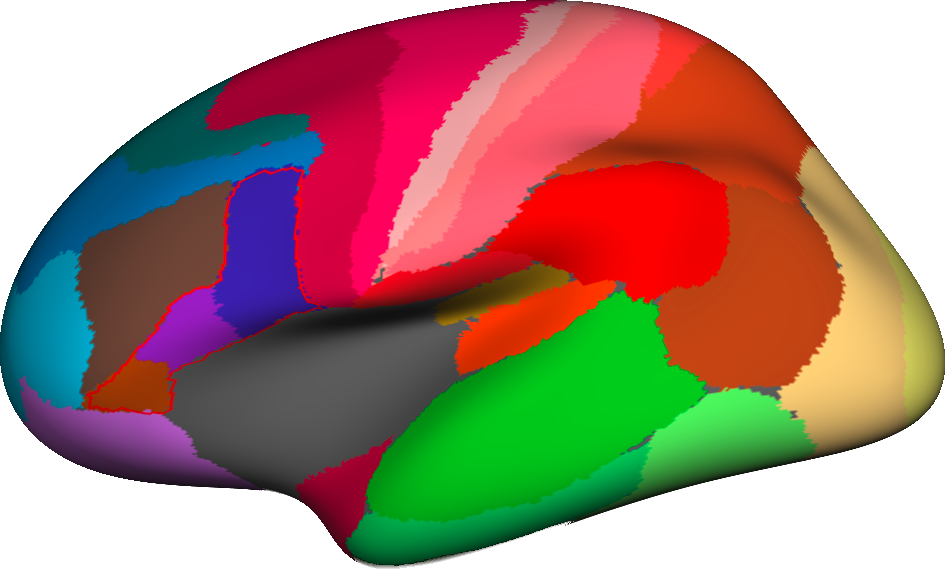
Same image, inflated version. The VLPFC is outlined with a red border.

The ventrolateral prefrontal cortex (VLPFC) is a section of the prefrontal cortex located on the inferior frontal gyrus, bounded superiorly by the inferior frontal sulcus and inferiorly by the lateral sulcus. It is attributed to the anatomical structures of Brodmann's area (BA) 47, 45 and 44 (considered the subregions of the VLPFC – the anterior, mid and posterior subregions).

Specific functional distinctions have been presented between the three Brodmann subregions of the VLPFC. There are also specific functional differences in activity in the right and left VLPFC. Neuroimaging studies employing various cognitive tasks have shown that the right VLPFC region is a critical substrate of control. At present, two prominent theories feature the right VLPFC as a key functional region. From one perspective, the right VLPFC is thought to play a critical role in motor inhibition, where control is engaged to stop or override motor responses. Alternatively, Corbetta and Shulman have advanced the hypothesis that there are two distinct frontoparietal networks involved in spatial attention, with the right VLPFC being a component of a right-lateralized ventral attention network that governs reflexive reorienting. From this perspective, the right lateral PFC, along with a region spanning the right temporoparietal junction (TPJ) and the inferior parietal lobule, are engaged when abrupt onsets occur in the environment, suggesting that these regions are involved in re-orienting attention to perceptual events that occur outside the current focus of attention. Also, the VLPFC is the end point of the ventral pathway (stream) that brings information about the stimuli's characteristics.

== Functions ==
The whole right VLPFC is active during motor inhibition, having a critical role, meaning when a person is walking and suddenly stops, the VLPFC activates to stop or override the motor activity in the cortex. The right posterior VLPFC (BA 44) is active during the updating of action plans. The right middle VLPFC (BA 45) responds to decision uncertainty (presumably in right-handed individuals).

== See also ==
- Attention versus memory in prefrontal cortex
- Attentional shift
- Cognitive control
- Dorsolateral prefrontal cortex
- Mesocortical pathway
- Wisconsin Card Sorting Test
- Working memory
