= Area 10 =

Area 10 can refer to:

- Area 10 (Nevada National Security Site)
- Brodmann area 10
