= BA10 =

BA10 may refer to:

- BA10, a postcode district in the BA postcode area
- BA-10, an armored car developed in the Soviet Union in the 1930s
- Brodmann area 10, part of the frontal cortex in the human brain
