= Brodmann area 46 =

Brain area

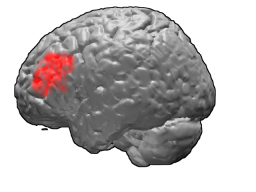

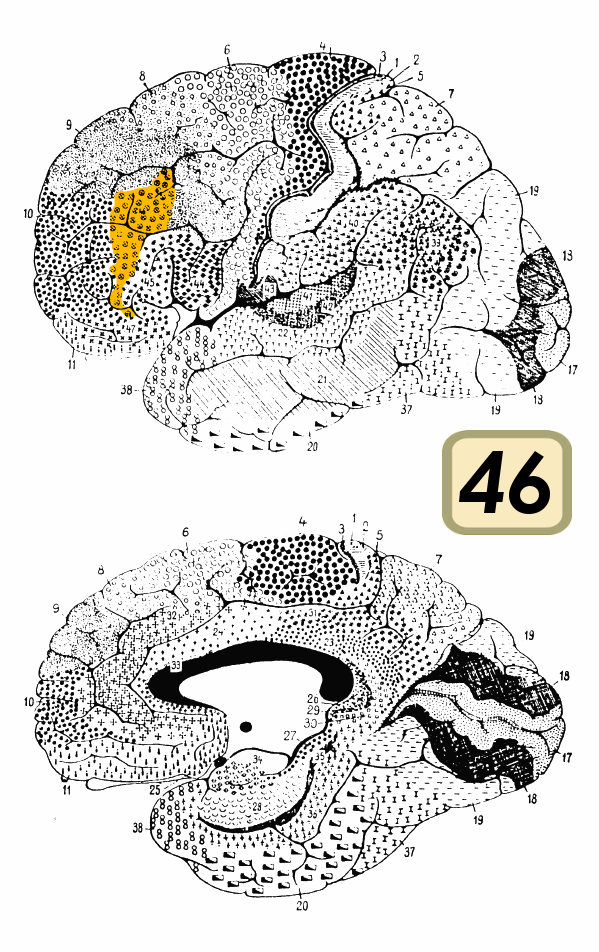

Details

Identifiers
- Latin: area frontalis media
- NeuroLex ID: birnlex_1778
- FMA: 68643

Brodmann area 46, or BA46, is part of the frontal cortex in the human brain. It is between BA10 and BA45.

BA46 is known as middle frontal area 46. In the human brain it occupies approximately the middle third of the middle frontal gyrus and the middle portion of the inferior frontal gyrus. Brodmann area 46 roughly corresponds with the dorsolateral prefrontal cortex (DLPFC), although the borders of area 46 are based on cytoarchitecture rather than function. The DLPFC also encompasses part of granular frontal area 9, directly adjacent on the dorsal surface of the cortex.

Cytoarchitecturally, BA46 is bounded dorsally by the granular frontal area 9, rostroventrally by the frontopolar area 10 and caudally by the triangular area 45 (Brodmann-1909). There is some discrepancy between the extent of BA8 (Brodmann-1905) and the same area as described by Walker (1940).

== Function ==
The dorsolateral prefrontal cortex plays a central role in sustaining attention and managing working memory, and has recently been shown to regulate self-control. It is one of the few cortical areas whose activity diminishes during REM sleep.

The high connectivity of this area within the frontal lobe as well as other parts of the brain means that damage can have a wide variety of effects. Lesions impair short-term memory, cause difficulty inhibiting responses, impair the ability to judge the relevance of stimuli, and cause problems in organization.

Recent research has shed light on the mechanism of working memory and the role of the dorsolateral prefrontal cortex. Studies using transcranial direct current stimulation (tDCS) observe changes in cortical activity due to either depolarization or hyperpolarization of underlying areas. The effect of these voltage shifts on activity in other structures is then measured. The goal of the studies is to identify the role of the dorsolateral prefrontal cortex in memory circuit modulation and learning.

In a limited research study, participants tested their baseline working memory with digit span exercises, then underwent tDCS for ten minutes before being retested with the exercises. Contrary to expectations, tDCS showed only minimal effects on working memory.

Due to the lack of coherent resources and data of the experiment, more WM experiments using tDCS need to be evaluated. Some applications being discussed involve using tDCS adjunctively with cognitive remediation to enhance WM in neurologic and psychiatric conditions.

A recent study found that targeting transcranial magnetic stimulation to Brodmann area 46 has better clinical efficacy treating depression, as its functionally is connected (negatively correlated) to Brodmann area 25.

== Image ==
Animation.

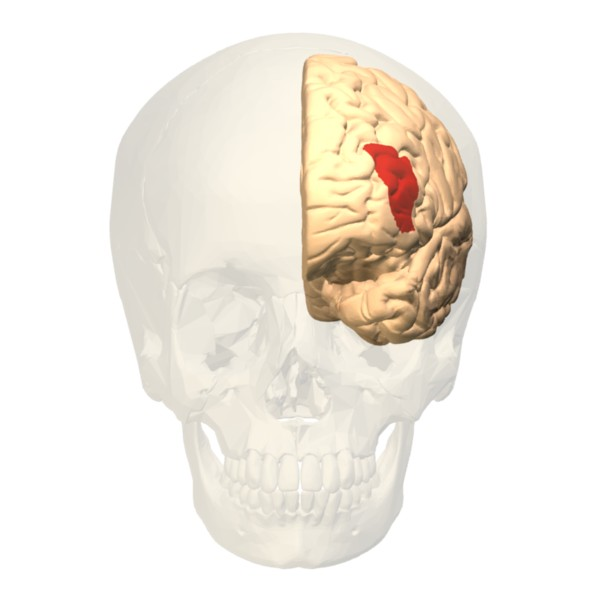
Frontal view.

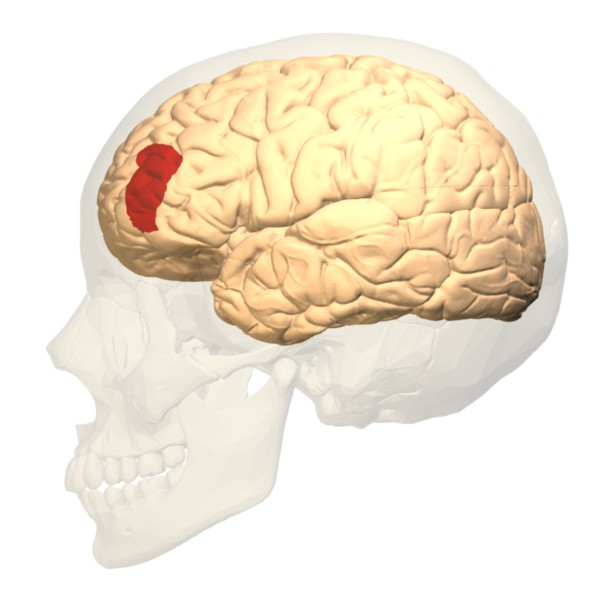
Lateral view.

== See also ==
- Brodmann area
- List of regions in the human brain

== Sources ==
- Petrides, M.; Pandya, D. N. (March 1999). "Dorsolateral prefrontal cortex: comparative cytoarchitectonic analysis in the human and the macaque brain and corticocortical connection patterns". European Journal of Neuroscience. 11 (3): 1011–1036. doi:10.1046/j.1460-9568.1999.00518.x. PMID 10103094. S2CID 26966267.
- Andrews, Sophie C.; Hoy, Kate E.; Enticott, Peter G.; Daskalakis, Zafiris J.; Fitzgerald, Paul B. (April 2011). "Improving working memory: the effect of combining cognitive activity and anodal transcranial direct current stimulation to the left dorsolateral prefrontal cortex". Brain Stimulation. 4 (2): 84–89. doi:10.1016/j.brs.2010.06.004. PMID 21511208. S2CID 19782638.
