= Dorsolateral prefrontal cortex =

Area of the prefrontal cortex of primates

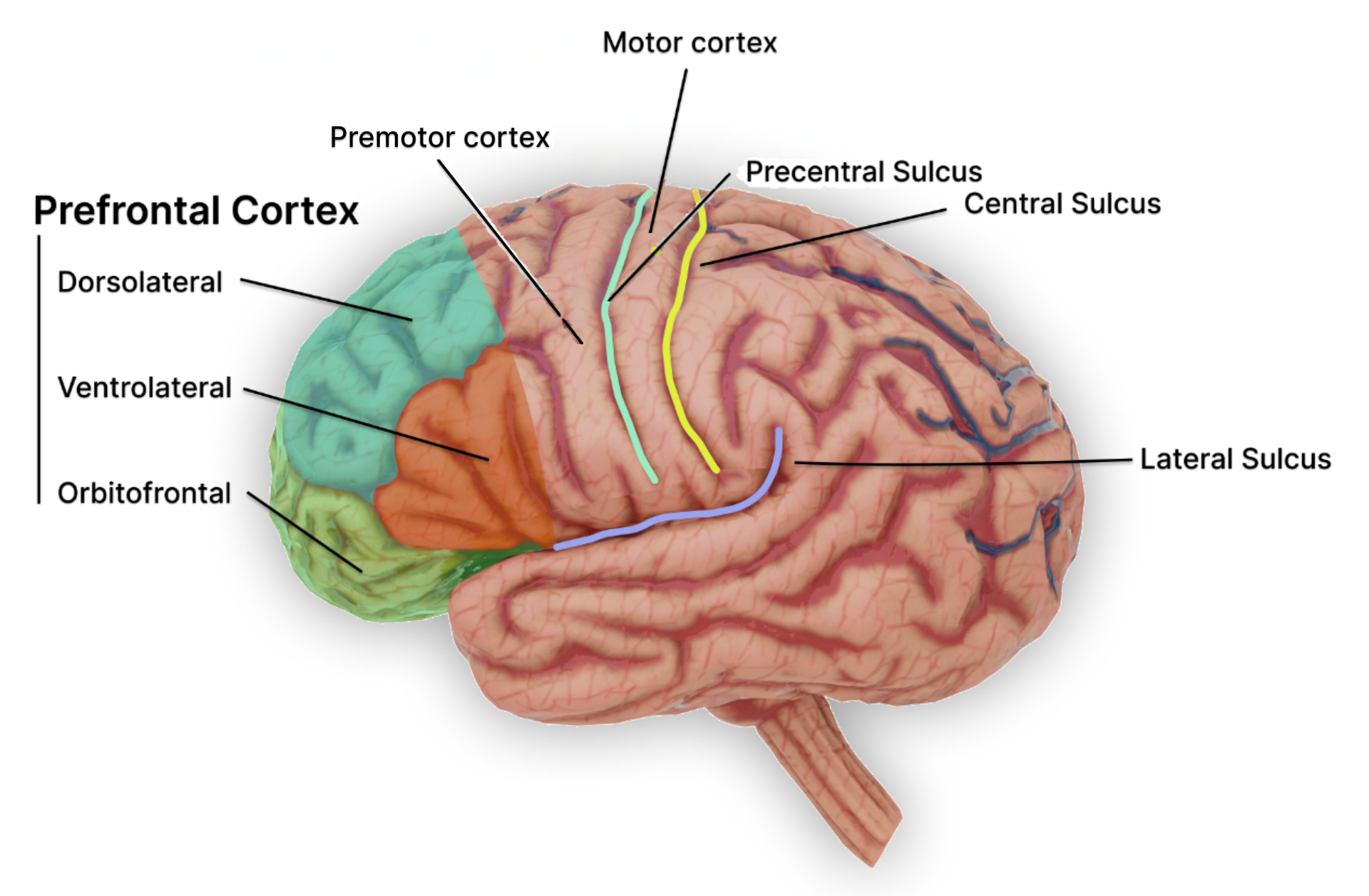
- An illustration of brain's prefrontal region

Details

Identifiers
- Latin: cortex praefrontalis dorsolateralis
- MeSH: D000087643
- FMA: 276189

The dorsolateral prefrontal cortex (dlPFC or DLPFC) is an area in the prefrontal cortex of the primate brain. It is one of the most recently derived parts of the human brain. It undergoes a prolonged period of maturation which lasts into adulthood. The dlPFC is not an anatomical structure, but rather a functional one. It lies in the middle frontal gyrus of humans (i.e., lateral part of Brodmann's area (BA) 9 and 46). In macaque monkeys, it is around the principal sulcus (i.e., in Brodmann's area 46). Other sources consider that dlPFC is attributed anatomically to BA 9 and 46 and BA 8, 9 and 10.

The dlPFC has connections with the orbitofrontal cortex, as well as the thalamus, parts of the basal ganglia (specifically, the dorsal caudate nucleus), the hippocampus, and primary and secondary association areas of neocortex (including posterior temporal, parietal, and occipital areas). The dlPFC is also the end point for the dorsal pathway (stream), which is concerned with how to interact with stimuli.

An important function of the dlPFC is the executive functions, such as working memory, cognitive flexibility, planning, inhibition, and abstract reasoning. However, the dlPFC is not exclusively responsible for executive functions. All complex mental activity requires the additional cortical and subcortical circuits with which the dlPFC is connected. The dlPFC is also the highest cortical area that is involved in motor planning, organization and regulation.

== Structure ==
The dlPFC is composed of spatial selective neurons, which gives it a neural circuitry that encompasses the entire range of sub-functions necessary to carry out an integrated response, such as: sensory input, retention in short-term memory, and motor signaling. Historically, the dlPFC was defined by its connection to the superior temporal cortex, the posterior parietal cortex, the anterior and posterior cingulate, the premotor cortex, the retrosplenial cortex, and the neocerebellum. These connections allow the dlPFC to regulate the activity of those regions, as well as to receive information from and be regulated by those regions.

Anatomical and Functional Subdivisions Overview Research from the 2010s onward has revealed that the dlPFC is not a functionally homogeneous region, but comprises multiple distinct subregions with specialized connectivity patterns and cognitive functions. This functional heterogeneity helps explain the variability in dlPFC activation locations across neuroimaging studies.

=== Early Evidence for Functional Heterogeneity (2013) ===
In 2013, meta-analytic connectivity modeling revealed a fundamental functional distinction within the right dlPFC, challenging the notion of a single, homogeneous region.

==== Anterior-Ventral Cluster (MNI coordinates: 30, 43, 23) ====
'Network connectivity: Increased connectivity with anterior cingulate cortex (ACC) and left homotopic dlPFC

Functional profile:

- Attention and action inhibition
- Conflict resolution (Stroop task, Go/No-Go paradigms)
- Performance monitoring and error detection

Proposed role: Higher-order cognitive control and behavioral adjustment in situations requiring increased performance monitoring

==== Posterior-Dorsal Cluster (MNI coordinates: 37, 33, 32) ====
Network connectivity: Increased connectivity with bilateral intraparietal sulcus (IPS) and left homotopic dlPFC.

Functional profile:

- Action execution
- Working memory (n-back, Sternberg tasks)
- Stimulus processing and motor planning

Proposed role: Executive operator for working memory manipulation and response implementation

The study demonstrated that these subdivisions showed consistent differences in both task-dependent and task-independent (resting-state) functional connectivity, suggesting fundamental differences in their neural organization.

==== Hierarchical Organization ====
The 2013 findings supported a hierarchical organization along the anterior-posterior axis of the dlPFC:

- Posterior regions: Involved in more basic processes of cognitive control, such as stimulus-response mapping and working memory maintenance.
- Anterior regions: Involved in more abstract processes such as performance monitoring and adjusting behavior when necessary.

This organization is consistent with the "cascade model" of prefrontal cortex organization, where progressively anterior regions support increasingly abstract representations and complex actions.

=== Multi-Modal Parcellation (2016) ===
In 2016, a comprehensive multi-modal parcellation study using magnetic resonance imaging (MRI)-based measures of cortical architecture, function, connectivity, and topography further confirmed the complex organization of the dlPFC. The study identified multiple distinct areas within the dlPFC region, supporting earlier findings of functional heterogeneity. This work demonstrated that:

The dlPFC could be subdivided into anterior and posterior subdivisions based on connectivity patterns. These subdivisions showed distinct functional profiles in task-based fMRI studies. Microstructural properties varied systematically across dlPFC subregions.

=== Detailed Cytoarchitectonic Mapping (2022) ===
A 2022 study provided high-resolution cytoarchitectonic mapping of the anterior dlPFC, identifying four distinct areas based on observer-independent analysis of cell-body distributions in post-mortem brains.

==== Newly Identified Areas ====
Superior Frontal Sulcus 1 (SFS1)

Location: Primarily within the depth of the superior frontal sulcus, extending to its banks. Cytoarchitecture: Prominent cell-dense layers II and IV; medium-sized pyramidal cells in layer III with slight size gradient; undivided layer V; sharp layer VI-white matter border. Structural connectivity: Dense fronto-parietal and fronto-limbic tracts; callosal fibers to contralateral dlPFC. Functional connectivity: Strong default mode network (DMN) affiliation, coupling with medial prefrontal cortex, precuneus, and angular gyrus. Task profile: Deactivated during working memory tasks (2-back > 0-back); activated during theory-of-mind and narrative processing. Functional role: Abstract reasoning, self-reflection, moral and social cognition. Volume: Approximately 754 ± 201 mm³.

Superior Frontal Sulcus 2 (SFS2)

Location: Ventral to SFS1, on the ascending ventral bank of the superior frontal sulcus, partly reaching the middle frontal gyrus surface. Cytoarchitecture: Thin layer II with no sharp border to layer III; very thin and blurry layer IV; gradient in pyramidal cell size across layer III (IIIa, IIIb, IIIc subdivisions); prominent layer VI. Structural connectivity: Links to superior parietal lobule, dorsal cingulate, and caudal superior frontal gyrus. Functional connectivity: Hybrid DMN ↔ Multiple-Demand Network (MDN) coupling; transitional node characteristics. Task profile: Mild activation in relational reasoning and social tasks; deactivation in high-load working memory. Functional role: Conceptual bridge mediating internal models with external rule structure. Volume: Approximately 578 ± 142 mm³.

Middle Frontal Gyrus 1 (MFG1)

Location: Occupies the surface of the anterior middle frontal gyrus; largest cortical thickness among anterior dlPFC areas. Cytoarchitecture: Large pyramidal cells in deeper layer III (subdivisions into IIIa, IIIb, IIIc); lower cell density in layer IIIa; visible but not highly prominent layer IV; well-developed infragranular layers V and VI (>50% of cortical width); diffuse white matter border. Structural connectivity: Massive bidirectional connectivity with parietal cortex (intraparietal sulcus, superior parietal lobule), premotor cortex, caudate nucleus, ACC; heavy superior longitudinal fasciculus (SLF) II/III terminations. Functional connectivity: Core MDN member; strongest and most stable MDN coupling across task states; anti-correlated with DMN. Task activation: Highest positive BOLD signal during working memory (2-back > 0-back), relational reasoning, gambling, and task-switching tasks; co-activates with parietal intraparietal sulcus. Functional role: Core executive operator implementing working memory manipulation, rule application, response inhibition; domain-general executive hub orchestrating goal maintenance and cognitive flexibility. Volume: Approximately 1,392 ± 278 mm³ (largest of the anterior areas).

Middle Frontal Gyrus 2 (MFG2)

Location: Ventral to MFG1, reaching into the ventrally neighboring frontomarginal sulcus or anterior middle frontal sulcus (when present). Cytoarchitecture: Relatively homogenous cell density and cell size across all layers due to absence of large pyramidal cells in layers III and V; dense layer II; broad, well-developed, cell-dense layer IV; densely packed layer VI; sharp white matter border. Structural connectivity: Moderate myelination; connections to inferior frontal sulcus, anterior insula, and mid-cingulate. Functional connectivity: Mixed MDN-salience network; gateway toward ventrolateral prefrontal cortex. Functional role: Integration of value and cognitive control; "executive-emotional broker". Volume: Approximately 1,069 ± 281 mm³.

==== Functional Integration Across Subregions ====
The 2022 study demonstrated that cytoarchitectonic subdivisions map onto functional subdivisions:

===== Dorsal-Rostral Tier (SFS1, 9a, 9p) – "Reflective Thinkers" =====
Thinner, lightly myelinated cortex;

- Functions: Abstract reasoning, self-reflection, social cognition, theory of mind
- Network: Strong DMN membership
- Task profile: Activated during narrative and social tasks; deactivated during high-load working memory

===== Mid-Lateral Tier (MFG1, areas 9-46d and 46) – "Integrators" =====
- Functions: Domain-general executive control, goal maintenance, cognitive flexibility
- Network: Core MDN membership
- Task profile: Robust activation across working memory, attention, inhibition, and relational reasoning tasks

===== Ventral-Caudal Tier (MFG2, areas a9-46v and p9-46v) – "Executors" =====
Thicker, heavily myelinated cortex;

- Functions: Concrete cognitive control, response selection, value integration, top-down modulation of motor programs
- Network: MDN with salience network contributions
- Task profile: Highest activation during working memory and decision-making with motor output

==== Microstructure-Function Relationship ====
The study confirmed that microstructural properties mirror functional specialization:

Connectivity defines function: Dorsal dlPFC regions "listen" to the self-referential DMN; ventral regions "talk" to the executive MDN. Function defines behavior: These interactions yield the full repertoire of planning, working memory, reasoning, and self-monitoring. Structure supports both: Histological gradients show microstructural tuning along the same axes seen in functional gradients.

=== Network Integration ===
The dlPFC subregions act as connector hubs between different large-scale brain networks:

Bridging subregions (e.g., 9-46d, a9-46v, SFS2) synchronize internal goal representations (DMN) with external task execution (MDN), dynamically reconfiguring as cognitive demands shift. Dorsal regions show greater coupling with self-referential processing networks and are involved in abstract, reflective cognition. Ventral regions show greater coupling with executive control and attention networks and are involved in concrete action control.

=== Sex Differences ===
Cytoarchitectonic studies have revealed area-specific sex differences in anterior dlPFC regions:

Females show significantly larger volumes in areas SFS2 (right hemisphere, p < 0.022) and MFG1 (right hemisphere, p < 0.036) compared to males. Right SFS1 also shows larger volume in females (p < 0.047). These differences are observed despite males having larger total brain volumes. No significant differences were found in the volume fraction of cell bodies (cytoarchitecture) between sexes These volumetric differences may relate to documented behavioral variations in cognitive control strategies, though functional implications require further investigation.

=== Clinical Relevance ===
The heterogeneous organization of dlPFC is particularly relevant for understanding neuropsychiatric disorders affecting executive function:

Schizophrenia: Layer III pyramidal neuron abnormalities specifically in mid-lateral dlPFC areas; smaller soma sizes, reduced axonal arbors, and shorter basilar dendrites in deeper layer III. Depression and bipolar disorder: Lamina-specific reductions in glial and neuronal density; downregulation of microglial genes. OCD: Alterations in dlPFC-ACC connectivity circuits. Executive dysfunction: Different dlPFC subregions may be differentially affected depending on the specific executive function impaired.

The dlPFC is also a central site of dysfunction in Attention Deficit Hyperactivity Disorder, Bipolar Disorder, Frontotemporal Dementia and in Alzheimer's disease. The dlPFC also regulates emotion through its connections to the medial PFC, and strengthening of the left dlPFC with transcranial magnetic stimulation is an approved treatment for major depressive disorder.

=== Historical Context ===
Traditional cytoarchitectonic maps showed considerable discrepancies in dlPFC parcellation:

Brodmann (1909): Divided dlPFC into two areas (BA 9 on superior frontal gyrus and BA 46 on middle frontal gyrus). von Economo and Koskinas (1925): Placed area 46 exclusively within middle frontal gyrus, surrounded by area 9 like an "island". Sarkissov et al. (1955): Similar to von Economo, with area 46 not bordered by area 45. Rajkowska and Goldman-Rakic (1995): First defined transitional areas (e.g., area 9-46) in depths of superior and middle frontal sulci. Petrides and Pandya (1999): Published similar map including transition areas.

These classical parcellations did not account for:

Intersubject variability in sulcal patterns (e.g., middle frontal sulcus present in only 86% of brains). Functional heterogeneity revealed by neuroimaging. Fine-grained connectivity differences. Three-dimensional organization within sulci. Direct superimposition with 3D functional imaging datasets.

Modern multi-modal approaches (2013-present) integrating cytoarchitecture, connectivity, and functional neuroimaging have revealed a significantly more complex organization with at least 4-6 distinct subregions in the anterior dlPFC alone.

=== Methodological Advances ===
The identification of dlPFC subdivisions has been enabled by several methodological advances:

Meta-analytic connectivity modeling (MACM): Delineates neural networks co-activated across many neuroimaging experiments. Resting-state functional connectivity: Measures synchronized spontaneous brain activity in task-free states. Observer-independent cytoarchitectonic mapping: Uses statistical image analysis to objectively identify cortical borders based on laminar cell-body distribution. Probabilistic mapping: Accounts for interindividual variability by creating probability maps across multiple brains in standardized stereotaxic space. Multi-modal integration: Combines structural MRI, functional MRI, diffusion MRI, and cytoarchitecture.

== Function ==
=== Primary functions ===
The dlPFC is known for its involvement in the executive functions, which is an umbrella term for the management of cognitive processes, including working memory, cognitive flexibility, and planning. A couple of tasks have been very prominent in the research on the dlPFC, such as the A-not-B task, the delayed response task and object retrieval tasks. The behavioral task that is most strongly linked to dlPFC is the combined A-not-B/delayed response task, in which the subject has to find a hidden object after a certain delay. This task requires holding information in mind (working memory), which is believed to be one of the functions of dlPFC. The importance of dlPFC for working memory was strengthened by studies with adult macaques. Lesions that destroyed dlPFC disrupted the macaques' performance of the A-not-B/delayed response task, whereas lesions to other brain parts did not impair their performance on this task.

dlPFC is not required for the memory of a single item. Thus, damage to the dorsolateral prefrontal cortex does not impair recognition memory. Nevertheless, if two items must be compared from memory, the involvement of dlPFC is required. People with damaged dlPFC are not able to identify a picture they had seen, after some time, when given the opportunity to choose from two pictures. Moreover, these subjects also failed in Wisconsin Card-Sorting Test as they lose track of the currently correct rule and persistently organize their cards in the previously correct rule. In addition, as dlPFC deals with waking thought and reality testing, it is not active when one is asleep. Likewise, dlPFC is most frequently related to the dysfunction of drive, attention and motivation. Patients with minor dlPFC damage display a lack of interest in their surroundings and are deprived of spontaneity in language as well as behavior. Patients may also be less alert than normal to people and events they know. Damage to this region in a person also leads to the lack of motivation to do things for themselves and/or for others.

==== Decision making ====
The dlPFC is involved in both risky and moral decision making; when individuals have to make moral decisions like how to distribute limited resources, the dlPFC is activated. This region is also active when costs and benefits of alternative choices are of interest. Similarly, when options for choosing alternatives are present, the dlPFC evokes a preference towards the most equitable option and suppresses the temptation to maximize personal gain.

==== Working memory ====
Working memory is the system that actively holds multiple pieces of transitory information in the mind, where they can be manipulated. The dlPFC is important for working memory; reduced activity in this area correlates to poor performance on working memory tasks. However, other areas of the brain are involved in working memory as well.

There is an ongoing discussion if the dlPFC is specialized in a certain type of working memory, namely computational mechanisms for monitoring and manipulating items, or if it has a certain content, namely visuospatial information, which makes it possible to mentally represent coordinates within the spatial domain.

There have also been some suggestions that the function of the dlPFC in verbal and spatial working memory is lateralised into the left and right hemisphere, respectively. Smith, Jonides and Koeppe (1996) observed a lateralisation of dlPFC activations during verbal and visual working memory. Verbal working memory tasks mainly activated the left dlPFC and visual working memory tasks mainly activated the right dlPFC. Murphy et al. (1998) also found that verbal working memory tasks activated the right and left dlPFC, whereas spatial working memory tasks predominantly activated the left dlPFC. Reuter-Lorenz et al. (2000) found that activations of the dlPFC showed prominent lateralisation of verbal and spatial working memory in young adults, whereas in older adults this lateralisation was less noticeable. It was proposed that this reduction in lateralisation could be due to recruitment of neurons from the opposite hemisphere to compensate for neuronal decline with ageing. Overall, the dlPFC is complex and yet not fully understood.

=== Secondary functions ===
The dlPFC may also be involved in the act of deception and lying, which is thought to inhibit normal tendency to truth telling. Research also suggests that using TMS on the dlPFC can impede a person's ability to lie or to tell the truth.

Additionally, supporting evidence suggests that the dlPFC may also play a role in conflict-induced behavioral adjustment, for instance when an individual decides what to do when faced with conflicting rules. One way in which this has been tested is through the Stroop test, in which subjects are shown a name of a color printed in colored ink and then are asked to name the color of the ink as fast as possible. Conflict arises when the color of the ink does not match the name of the printed color. During this experiment, tracking of the subjects' brain activity showed a noticeable activity within the dlPFC. The activation of the dlPFC correlated with the behavioral performance, which suggests that this region maintains the high demands of the task to resolve conflict, and thus in theory plays a role in taking control.

dlPFC may also be associated with human intelligence. However, even when correlations are found between the dlPFC and human intelligence, that does not mean that all human intelligence is a function of the dlPFC. In other words, this region may be attributed to general intelligence on a broader scale as well as very specific roles, but not all roles. For example, using imaging studies like PET and fMRI indicate dlPFC involvement in deductive, syllogistic reasoning. Specifically, when involved in activities that require syllogistic reasoning, left dlPFC areas are especially and consistently active.

The dlPFC may also be involved in threat-induced anxiety. In one experiment, participants were asked to rate themselves as behaviorally inhibited or not. Those who rated themselves as behaviorally inhibited, moreover, showed greater tonic (resting) activity in the right-posterior dlPFC. Such activity is able to be seen through electroencephalogram (EEG) recordings. Individuals who are behaviorally inhibited are more likely to experience feelings of stress and anxiety when faced with a particularly threatening situation. In one theory, anxiety susceptibility may increase as a result of present vigilance. Evidence for this theory includes neuroimaging studies that demonstrate dlPFC activity when an individual experiences vigilance. More specifically, it is theorized that threat-induced anxiety may also be connected to deficits in resolving problems, which leads to uncertainty. When an individual experiences uncertainty, there is increased activity in the dlPFC. In other words, such activity can be traced back to threat-induced anxiety.

==== Social cognition ====
Among the prefrontal lobes, the dlPFC seems to be the one that has the least direct influence on social behavior, yet it does seem to give clarity and organization to social cognition. The dlPFC seems to contribute to social functions through the operation of its main specialty – the executive functions – for instance, when handling complex social situations. Social areas in which the role of the dlPFC is investigated are, amongst others, social perspective taking and inferring the intentions of other people, or theory of mind; the suppression of selfish behavior, and commitment in a relationship.

==== Relation to neurotransmitters ====
As the dlPFC undergoes long maturational changes, one change that has been attributed to the dlPFC for making early cognitive advances is the increasing level of the neurotransmitter dopamine in the dlPFC. In studies where adult macaques' dopamine receptors were blocked, it was seen that the adult macaques had deficits in the A-not-B task, as if the dlPFC was taken out altogether. A similar situation was seen when the macaques were injected with MPTP, which reduces the level of dopamine in the dlPFC. Even though there have been no physiological studies about involvement of cholinergic actions in sub-cortical areas, behavioral studies indicate that the neurotransmitter acetylcholine is essential for working memory function of the dlPFC.

== Clinical significance ==
=== Schizophrenia ===
Schizophrenia may be partially attributed to a lack in activity in the frontal lobe. The dorsolateral prefrontal cortex is especially underactive when a person has chronic schizophrenia. Schizophrenia is also related to lack of dopamine neurotransmitter in the frontal lobe. The dlPFC dysfunctions are unique among the schizophrenia patients as those that are diagnosed with depression do not tend to have the same abnormal activation in the dlPFC during working memory-related tasks. Working memory is dependent upon the dlPFC's stability and functionality, thus reduced activation of the dlPFC causes schizophrenic patients to perform poorly on tasks involving working memory. The poor performance contributes to the added capacity limitations in working memory that is greater than the limits on normal patients. The cognitive processes that deal heavily with the dlPFC, such as memory, attention, and higher order processing, are the functions that once distorted contribute to the illness.

=== Depression ===
Along with regions of the brains such as the limbic system, the dorsolateral prefrontal cortex deals heavily with major depressive disorder (MDD). The dlPFC may contribute to depression due to being involved with the disorder on an emotional level during the suppression stage. While working memory tasks seem to activate the dlPFC normally, its decreased grey matter volume correlates to its decreased activity. The dlPFC may also have ties to the ventromedial prefrontal cortex in their functions with depression. This can be attributed to how the dlPFC's cognitive functions can also involve emotions, and the VMPFC's emotional effects can also involve self-awareness or self-reflection. Damage or lesion to the dlPFC can also lead to increased expression of depression symptoms. The noradrenergic alpha-2A receptor agonist, guanfacine, which strengthens PFC connections on spines, has been shown to reduce depressive symptoms in patients with the cognitive biotype of depression by strengthening the functional connectivity between the dlPFC and the vmPFC (Brodmann Area 32).

=== Stress ===
Exposure to severe stress may also be linked to damage in the dlPFC. More specifically, acute stress has a negative impact on the higher cognitive function known as working memory (WM), which is also traced to be a function of the dlPFC. Stress-induced impairment of prefrontal cortical function was first discovered in animals, and is due to high levels of cAMP-calcium signaling opening potassium channels on spines to rapidly weaken excitatory connections, a phenomenon known as Dynamic Network Connectivity. In an experiment of human cognition, researchers used functional magnetic resonance imaging (fMRI) to record the neural activity in healthy individuals who participated in tasks while in a stressful environment. When stress successfully impacted the subjects, their neural activity showed reduced working memory related activity in the dlPFC. These findings not only demonstrate the importance of the dlPFC region in relation to stress, but they also suggest that the dlPFC may play a role in other psychiatric disorders. In patients with post-traumatic stress disorder (PTSD), for example, daily sessions of right dorsolateral prefrontal repetitive transcranial magnetic stimulation (rTMS) at a frequency of 10 Hz resulted in more effective therapeutic stimulation.

=== Substance use ===
Substance use disorders (SUD) may correlate with dorsolateral prefrontal cortex dysfunction. Those who recreationally use drugs have been shown to engage in increased risky behavior, possibly correlating with a dysfunction of the dlPFC. The executive controlling functions of the dlPFC in individuals who recreationally use drugs may have a weaker connection from risk factoring areas such as the anterior cingulate cortex and insula. This weaker connection is even shown in healthy subjects, such as a patient who continued to make risky decisions with a disconnect between their dlPFC and insula. Lesions of the dlPFC may result in irresponsibility and freedom from inhibitions, and the use of drugs can invoke the same response of willingness or inspiration to engage in the daring activity.

==== Alcohol ====
Alcohol creates deficits on the function of the prefrontal cortex. As the anterior cingulate cortex works to inhibit any inappropriate behaviors through processing information to the executive network of the dlPFC, as noted before this disruption in communication can lead to these actions being made. In a task known as Cambridge risk task, SUD participants have been shown to have a lower activation of their dlPFC. Specifically in a test related to alcoholism, a task called the Wheel of Fortune (WOF) had adolescents with a family history of alcoholism present lower dlPFC activation. Adolescents that have had no family members with a history of alcoholism did not exhibit the same decrease of activity.

== See also ==
- Attention versus memory in prefrontal cortex
- Attentional shift
- Brodmann area 46
- Cognitive control
- Dorsomedial prefrontal cortex
- Mesocortical pathway
- Wisconsin Card Sorting Test
- Frontoparietal network
