= Patricia A. Reuter-Lorenz =

American psychologist

Patricia Ann Reuter-Lorenz
- Education: University of Toronto; State University of New York
- Scientific career
- Workplaces: Clarke Institute of Psychiatry; Cornell University; Dartmouth College; University of Michigan
- Thesis: Hemispheric control of spatial attention (1987)

Patricia Ann Reuter-Lorenz is an American psychologist who is the Michael I. Posner Collegiate Professor of Psychology and Neuroscience at the University of Michigan. Reuter-Lorenz is Chair of the School of Psychology and researches the cognitive mechanisms of attention. She was elected Fellow of the American Association for the Advancement of Science.

== Early life and education ==
Reuter-Lorenz was an undergraduate student at the State University of New York at Purchase in 1979. She moved to the University of Toronto for graduate studies, where she earned a master's degree in 1981. Her doctoral research considered the distribution of attention in space and how this was biased contralateral to the activated hemisphere. During her doctorate, she worked as an intern at the Clarke Institute of Psychiatry in Toronto. She received her doctorate in 1987. Reuter-Lorenz spent two years as a postdoctoral researcher at Cornell University before joining Dartmouth College as an assistant professor in research.

== Research and career ==
In 1992, Reuter-Lorenz joined the University of Michigan, where she established the Cognitive and Affective Neuropsychology Laboratory. Her research considers the cognitive and neural mechanisms of attention. Whilst she has served as a visiting researcher at University of Texas at Dallas and Bangor University, she remained at Michigan throughout her academic career. She was made Professor in 2002 and the Michael I. Posner Collegiate Professor in 2016.

Reuter-Lorenz has studied the neural processes of the aging brain. Together with Denise Park, she showed that whilst the brain underwent structural degradation with aging, it simultaneously builds new neural circuitry to accommodate for these changes. This model, known as CRUNCH, explains that loss in one area of the brain is compensated for by gains in others. If this 'scaffolding' starts early, the cognitive decline occurs faster.

== Awards and honors ==
- 2009 American Psychological Association Mentor Award
- 2010 Justine & Yves Sergent Award
- 2012 Elected Fellow of the Society of Experimental Psychologists
- 2013 Elected Fellow of the Psychonomic Society
- 2015 University of Michigan Distinguished Faculty Achievement Award
- 2021 World's Top 2% Scientists
- 2021 Elected Fellow of the American Association for the Advancement of Science

== Selected publications ==
- Denise C Park; Patricia Reuter-Lorenz (1 January 2009). "The adaptive brain: aging and neurocognitive scaffolding". Annual Review of Psychology. 60: 173–196. doi:10.1146/annurev.psych.59.103006.093656. ISSN 0066-4308. PMC 3359129. PMID 19035823. Wikidata Q33387373.
- Denise C Park; Patricia Reuter-Lorenz (1 January 2009). "The adaptive brain: aging and neurocognitive scaffolding". Annual Review of Psychology. 60: 173–196. doi:10.1146/annurev.psych.59.103006.093656. ISSN 0066-4308. PMC 3359129. PMID 19035823. Wikidata Q33387373.
- Reuter-Lorenz PA; Jonides J; Smith EE; Hartley A; Miller A; Marshuetz C; Koeppe RA (1 January 2000). "Age differences in the frontal lateralization of verbal and spatial working memory revealed by PET". Journal of Cognitive Neuroscience. 12 (1): 174–187. doi:10.1162/089892900561814. ISSN 0898-929X. PMID 10769314. Wikidata Q52027625.
- The cognitive neuroscience of mind : a tribute to Michael S. Gazzaniga. Michael S. Gazzaniga, Patricia Ann Reuter-Lorenz. Cambridge, Mass.: MIT Press. 2010. ISBN 978-0-262-26605-5. OCLC 646068765.
