= Brodmann area 45 =

Brain area

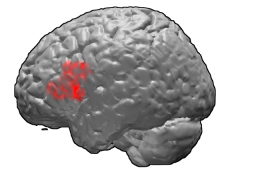

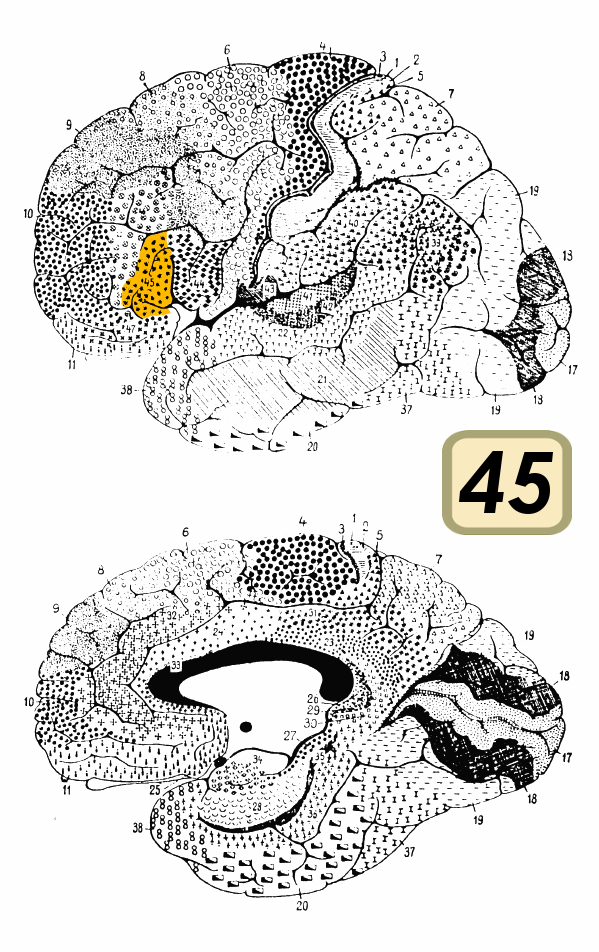

Details
- Part of: Cerebral cortex of frontal lobe in the human brain
- Artery: middle cerebral artery

Identifiers
- Latin: area triangularis
- NeuroLex ID: birnlex_1777
- FMA: 68642

Brodmann area 45 (BA45), is part of the frontal cortex in the human brain. It is situated on the lateral surface, inferior to BA9 and adjacent to BA46.

This area in humans occupies the triangular part of inferior frontal gyrus (H) and, surrounding the anterior horizontal limb of the lateral sulcus (H), a portion of the orbital part of the inferior frontal gyrus (H). Bounded caudally by the anterior ascending limb of the lateral sulcus (H), it borders on the insula in the depth of the lateral sulcus.

In terms of cytoarchitecture, it is bounded caudally by the opercular part of inferior frontal gyrus (Brodmann area 44 (BA44)), rostrodorsally by the middle frontal area 46 (BA46), and ventrally by the orbital part of inferior frontal gyrus (Brodmann area 47 BA47).

== Functions ==
The left-hemisphere Brodmann area 44 and Brodmann area 45 make up Broca's area, a region that is active in semantic tasks, such as semantic decision tasks (determining whether a word represents an abstract or a concrete entity) and generation tasks (generating a verb associated with a noun).

The precise role of BA45 in semantic tasks remains controversial. For some researchers, its role would be to subserve semantic retrieval or semantic working memory processes. Under this view, BA44 and BA45 would together guide recovery of semantic information and evaluate the recovered information with regard to the criterion appropriate to a given context. A slightly modified account of this view is that activation of BA45 is needed only under controlled semantic retrieval, when strong stimulus-stimulus associations are absent. For other researchers, BA45's role is not restricted to semantics per se, but to all activities that require task-relevant representations from among competing representations. Lesions of the BA45 lead to the characteristic findings of expressive aphasia in individuals who are left hemispheric dominant.

== Research findings ==
=== Asymmetry and language dominance ===
Triangular part of the inferior frontal gyrus. Shown in red.

A strong correlation has been found between speech-language and the anatomically asymmetric pars triangularis. Foundas, et al. showed that language function can be localized to one region of the brain, as Paul Broca had done before them, but they also supported the idea that one side of the brain is more involved with language than the other. The human brain has two hemispheres, and each one looks similar to the other; that is, it looks like one hemisphere is a mirror image of the other. However, Foundas, et al. found that the pars triangularis in Broca's area is actually larger than the same region in the right side of the brain. This "leftward asymmetry" corresponded both in form and function, which means that the part of the brain that is active during language processing is larger. In almost all the test subjects, this was the left side. In fact, the only subject tested that had right-hemispheric language dominance was found to have a rightward asymmetry of the pars triangularis.

Certain other researchers, however, have found no volumetric asymmetries in the pars triangularis. They have challenged previous findings that pars triangularis asymmetry exists and have suggested that inconsistencies in previous findings may be due to great variability in inter-individual pars triangularis morphology. That is, these regions tend to vary in size and shape much more than other areas of the brain, such as deep cortical nuclei. Furthermore, while these researcher found statistically significant asymmetries in the pars opercularis and the planum temporale, they found no correlations between asymmetries of these brain regions with that of the pars triangularis.

=== Connections in inferior frontal gyrus ===
At least one study demonstrated a high degree of connectivity between the three subregions of the inferior frontal gyrus (IFG). By stimulating one region of the IFG and measuring the response in distinct regions, these researchers were able to demonstrate the existence of numerous pathways between the pars triangularis and pars opercularis. Also, stimulation of one region of the pars triangularis elicited a response in distinct regions of the pars triangularis, illustrating the presence of networks within the subgyral region.

Additionally, The pars triangularis was implicated in semantic processing of language. By measuring the response of the brain by electroencephalography as it responded to different sentence types (those with or without semantic errors), Maess et al. demonstrated a time-lag in the comprehension of erroneous sentences. To understand this one would only need to imagine a person being told something they did not understand. They would pause and take a moment to process the information. Furthermore, these researchers demonstrated a characteristic processing pattern called an "N400", which refers to a negativity that appears in the pars triangularis about 400 ms after the syntactic mismatch is presented. However, the pars triangularis is likely to be only part of the network generating the N400 response in EEG since the magnetic counterpart N400m measured using MEG has been consistently localized to the superior temporal cortex.

=== Prefrontal cortex and the cognitive control of memory ===
Pars triangularis has been shown to have a role in cognitive control of memory. There are more ways than one to remember something. When a person remembers, they retrieve information from storage in a memory center of the brain. This information may be the muscle contraction sequence for shoe-tying, the face of a loved one, or anything in between. When someone remembers something automatically, without concentrating on it and without trying, it is called "bottom-up" processing. But sometimes, people really have to struggle to remember something. A student taking a test and trying to remember the answer to a question is concentrating their attention on retrieving the memory. The student is exhibiting cognitive control over their memory. This type of processing is directed, in part, by the ventrolateral prefrontal cortex (VLPFC). Pars triangularis is found in this region.

When reading aloud, people must decode written language to decipher its pronunciation. This processing takes place in Broca's area. The reader might use previous knowledge of a word in order to correctly vocalize it, or the reader might use knowledge of systematic letter combinations, which represent corresponding phonemes. Scientists can learn about what the brain is doing while people process language by looking at what it does with errors in language. As above, scientists can investigate the extra processing that occurs when people are challenged with a problem. In this case, scientists took advantage of the way pseudo-words and exception words by examining the brain as it interprets these problematic words. When people process language, they use different parts of Broca's area for different things. Pars triangularis is involved in a specific type of language processing. Specifically, pars triangularis becomes activated when people read exception words, which are words with atypical spelling-to-sound relationships. For example, "have" is an exception word because it is pronounced with a short "a", which is contrary to grammatical rules of pronunciation. The "e" at the end of the word should lead to the pronunciation of the long "a" sound, as in "cave" or "rave". Because we are so familiar with the word "have", we are able to remember its pronunciation, and we don't have to think through the rules each time we read it. Pars triangularis helps us do that.

When trying to retrieve information in a top-down fashion, some kind of control mechanism is necessary. Recalling that top-down retrieval depends on conscious control, it is easy to see that there must be some way to exclude irrelevant data from the retrieval. In order to home in on the desired information, some selection must occur. This selection is thought to occur post-retrieval in the mid-VLPFC, which corresponds generally to the location of pars triangularis. The theory here is that information is retrieved by certain regions of the left VLPFC, and then it is selected for relevance in another region. This is called the "two part" model of memory retrieval.

Almost every person in the world has learned at least one language. Also, almost everyone that has learned a language has learned it at a young age. Some people are multilingual. Some of these multilingual have learned second or third languages in concert with their first, at a young age, and some have learned other languages in their adulthood. Studies on different subsets of monolinguals and multilinguals have revealed some interesting findings.

By looking at the similarities between the first and second language and what they do to the brain, these researchers found that brain activation looked very different depending on which language the test subjects were processing. They found that pars triangularis activation changes during processing of these different languages, which is understandable considering the known role of pars triangularis in language.

There is a difference between the processing patterns of primary and secondary languages in processing of passive sentences. These are sentences using some form of the verb "be" with a verb in the past participle form. For example, "He is ruined" is a passive sentence because the verb "ruin" is in the past participle form and used with "is", which is a form of the verb "be". This study shows that processing this sentence, late bilinguals used their pars triangularis much more than their counterparts. This result implies certain things about the way language is learned. For example, It has been suggested that the reason people often have such difficulty learning foreign languages during adulthood is that their brains are trying to code language information in a region of the brain that is not dedicated to understanding language. According to this view, this is the reason native speakers are able to speak so quickly while their late-bilingual counterparts are forced to stutter as they struggle to process grammatical rules.

=== Cortical dynamics of word recognition ===
There is a theory that pars triangularis is especially involved in semantic processing of language, as opposed to phonological processing. That is, pars triangularis is thought to be more involved in deciphering the meaning of words rather than trying to decide what the word is based on the sound that goes into the ear. This study got data that supported this theory. Furthermore, these researchers saw evidence for parallel semantic processing, which occurs when the brain multitasks. When their subjects were undergoing experimentation, they were presented with consonant strings, pseudo-words, and words, and the delay between stimulus and brain activity was about the same for phonological and semantic processing, even though the two seemed to occur in slightly different regions.

In the study "Semantic Encoding and Retrieval in the Left Inferior Prefrontal Cortex: A Functional magnetic resonance imaging Study of Task Difficulty and Process Specificity", researchers found that pars triangularis (as well as some of its neighbors) increased its activity during semantic encoding, regardless of difficulty of the word being processed. This is consistent with the theory that pars triangularis is involved in semantic processing more than phonological processing. Furthermore, they found that these semantic encoding decisions resulted in less involvement of pars triangularis with repetition of the used words. It may seem intuitive that practice would make the brain better at recognizing the words as they reappeared, but there is something else to be learned from this result, as well. That pars triangularis activity went down with repetition also signifies the movement of the task of recognizing the word from the conscious to the passive. This is called repetition priming, and it occurs independent of intention. This idea, when paired with theories about pt's involvement in conscious retrieval of memory, serves to illustrate the complexity of the brain and its functions. These results together imply the possibility that similar mechanics are required for encoding and retrieving information. Another point of interest was that decreased pars triangularis activation with repetition did not occur with redundant presentation of nonsemantically processed words.

=== On Broca, brain, and binding: a new framework ===
A person is highly interconnected with other regions of the brain, especially those in the left frontal language network. Though its function seems to be distinct from its neighbors, this high degree of connectivity supports the idea that language can be integrated into many of the seemingly unrelated thought processes we have. This is not a difficult idea to imagine. For instance, attempting to remember the name of a brand new acquaintance can be challenging, and it often demands the attention of the person doing the remembering. In this example, a person is trying to comprehend sound as a part of language, place the word they just heard in the category "names", while associating it also as a tag for the face they just saw, simultaneously committing all of these pieces of data to memory. In this view, it hardly seems far-fetched that the roles of pars triangularis in language processing, semantic comprehension, and conscious control of memory are unrelated. In fact, it would be unlikely for pars triangularis not to have multiple roles in the brain, especially considering its high degree of connectivity, both within the left frontal language center, and to other regions.

=== Schizophrenia and Broca area ===
Schizophrenia is a poorly understood disease with complicated symptoms. In an effort to find a cause for this problem, these researchers looked at the brains of schizophrenic patients. It had been shown previously that abnormal gyrification, asymmetry, complexity, and variability occur in patients with schizophrenia. These investigators presented data showing that pt, specifically was highly distorted in schizophrenic patients compared with demographically matched normal subjects. They asserted that Broca's area is an especially plastic region of the brain in that its morphology can change dramatically from childhood to adulthood. This makes sense when considering the special ability of children to easily learn language, but it also means that the involvement of Broca's area is limited with respect to memory and recall; children do not seem to be unable to consciously search their memories. Furthermore, investigators took volumetric measurements of the grey and white matter of the brains of their test subjects and compared those measurements to their normal control subjects. They found that schizophrenic patients had dramatically reduced white matter.

As the brain develops, connectivity of different regions changes dramatically. Researchers found that there is a discrepancy in the way white matter and grey matter develop in schizophrenic patients. People with schizophrenia tend to have an absence of white matter expansion.

=== Heuristic and analytic reasoning ===
Transcranial magnetic stimulation applied to the left BA45 facilitated incongruent reasoning performance and impaired congruent reasoning performance, suggesting that the left BA45 is a component of a belief-based heuristic system. The right BA45 involvement in blocking the heuristic system is inferred from the blocking of the left homologue and resulting facilitation of logical-analytic reasoning performance.

== Images ==
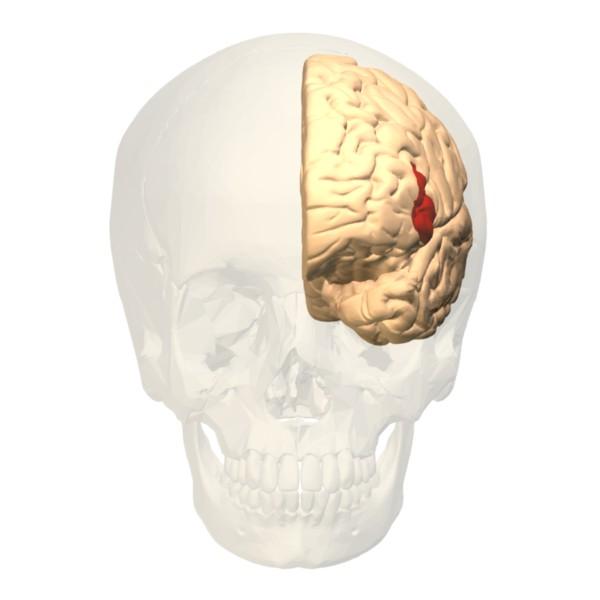
Frontal view.

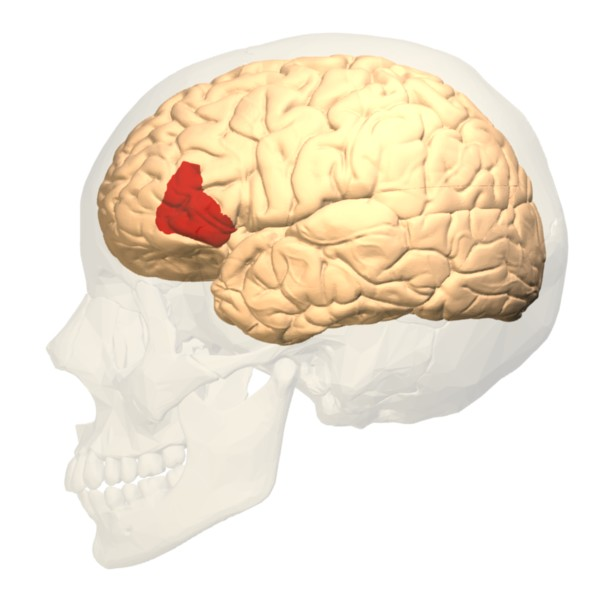
Lateral view.

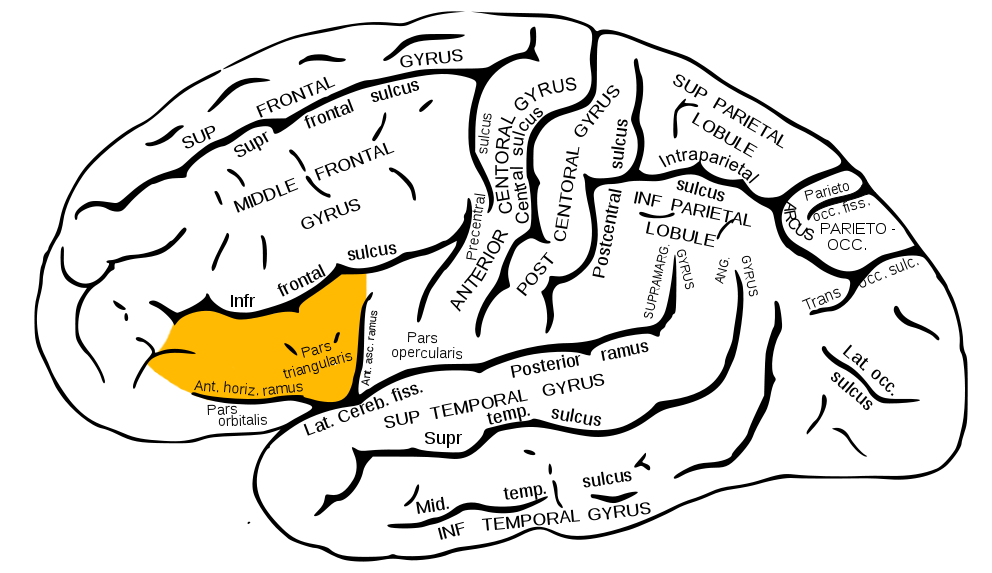
Lateral surface of left cerebral hemisphere, viewed from the side. (shown in orange).

== See also ==
- Brodmann area
- List of regions in the human brain
