= Brodmann area 44 =

Brain area

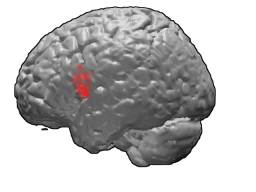

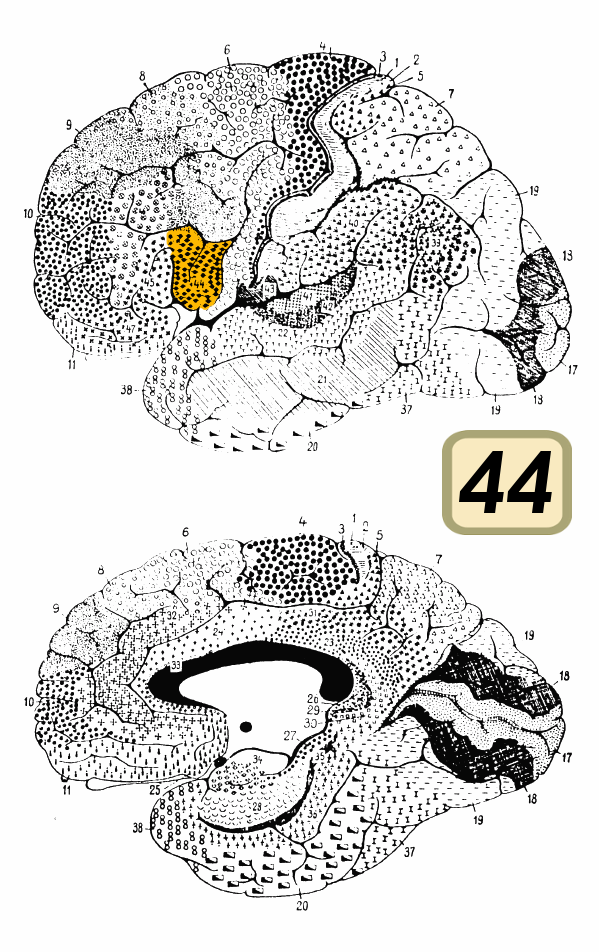

Details
- Artery: middle cerebral artery

Identifiers
- Latin: area opercularis
- NeuroLex ID: birnlex_1776
- FMA: 68641

Brodmann area 44, or BA44, is part of the frontal cortex in the human brain. It is situated just anterior to premotor cortex (BA6) and on the lateral surface, inferior to BA9.

This area is also known as pars opercularis (of the inferior frontal gyrus), and it refers to a subdivision of the cytoarchitecturally defined frontal region of cerebral cortex. In the human it corresponds approximately to the opercular part of the inferior frontal gyrus. Thus, it is bounded caudally by the inferior precentral sulcus (H) and rostrally by the anterior ascending limb of lateral sulcus (H). It surrounds the diagonal sulcus (H). In the depth of the lateral sulcus it borders on the insula. Cytoarchitectonically it is bounded caudally and dorsally by the agranular frontal area 6, dorsally by the granular frontal area 9 and rostrally by the triangular part of inferior frontal gyrus (Brodmann area 45 BA 45).

== Functions ==
Together with left-hemisphere BA45, the left hemisphere BA44 comprises Broca's area, a region involved in semantic tasks. Some data suggest that BA44 is more involved in the motor aspect of speech. Some recent findings also suggest the implication of this region in music perception. Recent neuroimaging studies show BA44 involvement in selective response suppression in go/no-go tasks and is therefore believed to play an important role in the suppression of response tendencies. This may apply mainly to the right BA44. Neuroimaging studies also demonstrate that area 44 is related to hand movements.

The presence of mirror neurons in Broca's area suggests language evolved from a gesture imitating system. Broca's area is also involved with theory of mind (ToM), which is the ability to understand the mental state of others through observation, inferring, and projecting.

== Trivia ==
Scott Flansburg of Herkimer, NY is a "human calculator" who can perform complex arithmetic in his head. Profiled on the TV show Stan Lee's Superhumans, his brain was scanned using fMRI while doing complex calculations, which showed brain activity in this region was absent. Instead there was activity somewhat higher than that of area 44 and closer to the motor cortex.

== Image ==
Animation.

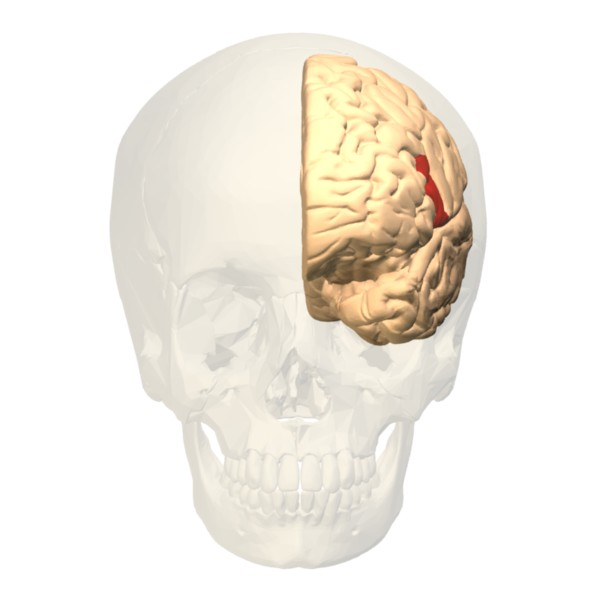
Frontal view.

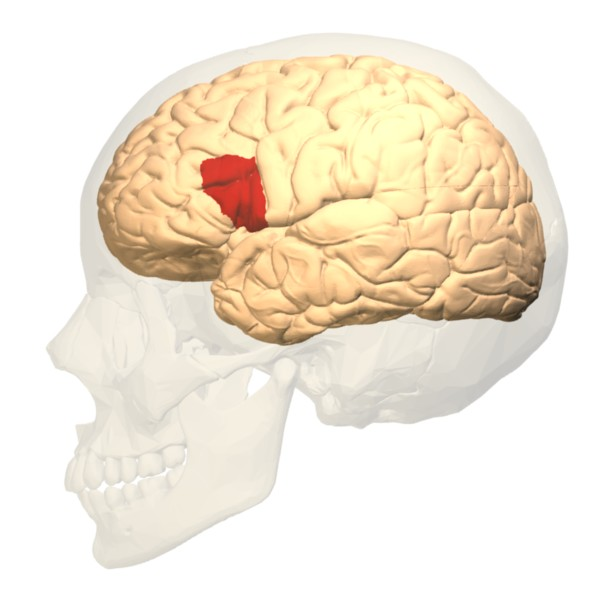
Lateral view.

== See also ==
- Brodmann area
- List of regions in the human brain
