= Autapse =

Chemical or electrical synapse from a neuron onto itself

An autapse is a chemical or electrical synapse from a neuron onto itself. It can also be described as a synapse formed by the axon of a neuron on its own dendrites, in vivo or in vitro.

== History ==
The term "autapse" was first coined in 1972 by Van der Loos and Glaser, who observed them in Golgi preparations of the rabbit occipital cortex while originally conducting a quantitative analysis of neocortex circuitry. Also in the 1970s, autapses have been described in dog and rat cerebral cortex, monkey neostriatum, and cat spinal cord.

In 2000, they were first modeled as supporting persistence in recurrent neural networks. In 2004, they were modeled as demonstrating oscillatory behavior, which was absent in the same model neuron without autapse. More specifically, the neuron oscillated between high firing rates and firing suppression, reflecting the spike bursting behavior typically found in cerebral neurons. In 2009, autapses were, for the first time, associated with sustained activation. This proposed a possible function for excitatory autapses within a neural circuit. In 2014, electrical autapses were shown to generate stable target and spiral waves in a neural model network. This indicated that they played a significant role in stimulating and regulating the collective behavior of neurons in the network. In 2016, a model of resonance was offered.

Autapses have been used to simulate "same cell" conditions to help researchers make quantitative comparisons, such as studying how N-methyl-D-aspartate receptor (NMDAR) antagonists affect synaptic versus extrasynaptic NMDARs.

== Formation ==
Recently, it has been proposed that autapses could possibly form as a result of neuronal signal transmission blockage, such as in cases of axonal injury induced by poisoning or impeding ion channels. Dendrites from the soma in addition to an auxiliary axon may develop to form an autapse to help remediate the neuron's signal transmission.

== Structure and function ==
Autapses can be either glutamate-releasing (excitatory) or GABA-releasing (inhibitory), just like their traditional synapse counterparts. Similarly, autapses can be electrical or chemical by nature.

Broadly speaking, negative feedback in autapses tends to inhibit excitable neurons whereas positive feedback can stimulate quiescent neurons.

Although the stimulation of inhibitory autapses did not induce hyperpolarizing inhibitory post-synaptic potentials in interneurons of layer V of neocortical slices, they have been shown to impact excitability. Upon using a GABA-antagonist to block autapses, the likelihood of an immediate subsequent second depolarization step increased following a first depolarization step. This suggests that autapses act by suppressing the second of two closely timed depolarization steps and therefore, they may provide feedback inhibition onto these cells. This mechanism may also potentially explain shunting inhibition.

In cell culture, autapses have been shown to contribute to the prolonged activation of B31/B32 neurons, which significantly contribute food-response behavior in Aplysia. This suggests that autapses may play a role in mediating positive feedback. The B31/B32 autapse was unable to play a role in initiating the neuron's activity, although it is believed to have helped sustain the neuron's depolarized state. The extent to which autapses maintain depolarization remains unclear, particularly since other components of the neural circuit (i.e. B63 neurons) are also capable of providing strong synaptic input throughout the depolarization. Additionally, it has been suggested that autapses provide B31/B32 neurons with the ability to quickly repolarize. Bekkers (2009) has proposed that specifically blocking the contribution of autapses and then assessing the differences with or without blocked autapses could better illuminate the function of autapses.

Hindmarsh–Rose (HR) model neurons have demonstrated chaotic, regular spiking, quiescent, and periodic patterns of burst firing without autapses. Upon the introduction of an electrical autapse, the periodic state switches to the chaotic state and displays an alternating behavior that increases in frequency with a greater autaptic intensity and time delay. On the other hand, excitatory chemical autapses enhanced the overall chaotic state. The chaotic state was reduced and suppressed in the neurons with inhibitory chemical autapses. In HR model neurons without autapses, the pattern of firing altered from quiescent to periodic and then to chaotic as DC current was increased. Generally, HR model neurons with autapses have the ability to swap into any firing pattern, regardless of the prior firing pattern.

== Location ==
Neurons from several brain regions, such as the neocortex, substantia nigra, and hippocampus have been found to contain autapses.

Autapses have been observed to be relatively more abundant in GABAergic basket and dendrite-targeting cells of the cat visual cortex compared to spiny stellate, double bouquet, and pyramidal cells, suggesting that the degree of neuron self-innervation is cell-specific. Additionally, dendrite-targeting cell autapses were, on average, further from the soma compared to basket cell autapses.

80% of layer V pyramidal neurons in developing rat neocortices contained autaptic connections, which were located more so on basal dendrites and apical oblique dendrites rather than main apical dendrites. The dendritic positions of synaptic connections of the same cell type were similar to those of autapses, suggesting that autaptic and synaptic networks share a common mechanism of formation.

== Disease implications ==
In the 1990s, paroxysmal depolarizing shift-type interictal epileptiform discharges has been suggested to be primarily dependent on autaptic activity for solitary excitatory hippocampal rat neurons grown in microculture.

More recently, in human neocortical tissues of patients with intractable epilepsy, the GABAergic output autapses of fast-spiking (FS) neurons have been shown to have stronger asynchronous release (AR) compared to both non-epileptic tissue and other types of synapses involving FS neurons. The study found similar results using a rat model as well. An increase in residual Ca2+ concentration in addition to the action potential amplitude in FS neurons was suggested to cause this increase in AR of epileptic tissue. Anti-epileptic drugs could potentially target this AR of GABA that seems to rampantly occur at FS neuron autapses.

== Effects of drugs ==
Using a glia-conditioned medium to treat glia-free purified rat retinal ganglion microcultures has been shown to significantly increase the number of autapses per neuron compared to a control. This suggests that glia-derived soluble, proteinase K-sensitive factors induce autapse formation in rat retinal ganglion cells.
