= Oblique dendrite =

Type of extensions of neurons

An oblique dendrite is a dendrite that branches from an apical dendrite that emerges from the apex of a pyramidal cell. Oblique dendrites typically branch one to two times before terminating. Dendrites are extensions of the cell body of a neuron.

== Growth and development ==
The growth and development of oblique dendrites in rats has been linked to the type of environment, or condition, they are placed in. This is also known as environmental enrichment. The three types of conditions used in studies are an enriched conditioned, standard condition, and impoverished condition. The enriched condition contains mazes, an exercise wheel, other rats, and toys. The standard condition generally has a wheel for voluntary exercise and other rats. The impoverished condition only contains fellow rats.

Animals placed in an enriched environment had heavier, thicker cortexes and an increase in the number of dendritic branches (including oblique dendrites) in the hippocampus than the standard or impoverished condition. This phenomenon is known as neuroplasticity. Furthermore, the enriched condition may show in increase in monoamine neurotransmitter release such as serotonin and noradrenaline which have been linked to synaptic plasticity and learning. This is important because an increase in oblique dendrites and dendritic branching allows for increased neurotransmitter uptake. Environmental enrichment is crucial in early brain development due to increase formation of synapses, or synaptogenesis. This results in an increase in oblique dendrites and dendritic branching.

== Effects on oblique dendrites from Alzheimer’s disease ==
The beta amyloid peptide, which may lead to the formation of amyloid plaques, has been linked to Alzheimer's disease. The peptide has been shown to block A-type voltage-gated potassium channel in pyramidal cell dendrites; the thin branches of the oblique dendrites are especially susceptible to disruption from the beta amyloid blockage of the A-type potassium channels which may lead to decline in cognitive function in the early stages of Alzheimer's disease.

== See also ==
- Alzheimer's disease
- Neuroplasticity
- Neurobiology
- Neuropathology
- Neurophysiology
