= Basal dendrite =

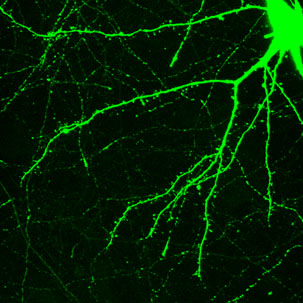
Dendriticspines

A basal dendrite is a dendritic process that originates from the basal aspect of a neuron’s soma, in contrast to apical dendrites. This is most commonly associated with Pyramidal neurons, but has also been described in other cell types, such as dentate granule cells and mitral cells. The specific morphology and function of basal dendrites vary based on species, cell type, and position within the brain. However, basal dendrites generally participate in receiving and integrating synaptic input.

== Pyramidal neurons ==
=== Morphology ===
Basal dendrites are a feature of pyramidal neurons and emanate from the base of the soma. These neurons typically have many small basal dendrites along with one large apical dendrite. In mammals, the basal dendrites of pyramidal neurons are typically short tufts but can vary in size, shape, and spine density depending on location. In macaques, the basal dendrites of pyramidal neurons are especially large in the prefrontal cortex relative to other regions. It was found that the basal dendrites of layer II/III pyramidal neurons are simpler and have lower spine density in the primary visual cortex than in higher-order visual areas. This same study also found that, in macaques, the basal dendrites of the prefrontal cortex were especially large, complex, and spiny.

=== Synaptic inputs and integration ===
Dendrites of pyramidal neurons, both basal and apical, typically receive excitatory glutamatergic signals, whereas the soma receives inhibitory GABAergic signals. Basal dendrites often receive inputs from cell populations that are distinct from those connected to distal apical dendrites. In many pyramidal neurons, basal and proximal apical dendrites receive inputs from local neural circuits, whereas distal apical dendrites receive inputs from more distant cell populations. In many mammalian CA1 pyramidal neurons, basal and proximal apical dendrites will receive input primarily from CA3 pyramidal neurons, whereas the distal apical dendrites will receive input from neurons in the entorhinal cortex and thalamic nucleus reuniens.

Basal dendrites of neocortical pyramidal neurons primarily receive local signals from lower-order cortical areas in bottom-up, feed-forward circuits. In the layer II/III pyramidal cells of the cortex, basal dendrites receive signals from layer IV neurons and local-circuit excitation. NMDA spikes amplify the signals received simultaneously at a basal dendrite and increase the likelihood of an action potential.

=== Excitability and plasticity ===
==== Synaptic plasticity ====
The synapses on the proximal basal dendrites of neocortical pyramidal neurons can be potentiated by pairing EPSPs with back-propagating action potentials. Potentiation of synapses on distal basal dendrites can be initiated by a strong synaptic activation, sufficient to trigger an NMDA spike, and can be facilitated by the neuro-modulatory signal BDNF (Brain-derived Neurotrophic Factor).

It is theorized that the organization of inputs across basal, proximal, apical dendrites, and distal apical dendrites may be functionally significant. The arrangement of signals from distant sources on distal apical dendrites and local signals on basal and proximal apical dendrites may contribute to the pyramidal neuron’s coincidence detection. Alternatively, it is postulated that this arrangement is meant to modulate responsiveness to local signals.

Caffeine has been observed to increase the length, number and branching of spines on basal dendrites of CA1 hippocampal neurons. It is believed that these effects are mediated by long-term potentiation in hippocampal synapses.

A recent study posits that physical exercise contributes to the structural plasticity of the hippocampus by increasing spine density of CA1 basal dendrites. It is believed this effect is mediated by IGF-1 upregulation.

==== Contribution to neuronal output ====
Basal dendrites of pyramidal neurons have been observed to experience NMDA-mediated Dendritic spikes, an ability yet to be seen in the apical dendrites under certain conditions. This suggests the excitatory behavior of these two groups may differ. Dendritic Spikes are Threshold-dependent potentials generated within dendrites that influence the soma. They amplify signals received by the soma and influence action potential generation. The individual branches of a basal dendrite exhibit nonlinear excitability due to the formation of NMDA spikes and have the capacity to act independently. The combined output of these individual branches is then summed at the soma.

The basal dendrites of Layer V Pyramidal neurons in the neocortex are known to support backpropagation of Action potentials. High-frequency action potential firing from the Soma has been observed to trigger Ca^{2+} dendritic spikes in the Basal Dendrites due to Backpropagation.

=== Clinical significance ===
Reductions in dendritic branching and spine density in basal dendrites of pyramidal neurons in the medial prefrontal cortex has been reported to be linked with schizophrenia. Other studies have also reported reduced dendritic spine volume in basal dendrites of CA3 neurons in the hippocampus. Alterations in the expression TAOK2 (thousand-and-one amino acid kinase 2), which is implicated in dendritic regulation, has been reported in both autism and schizophrenia.

=== Gene expression ===
Basal dendrite growth is regulated by Semaphorin 3A and its receptor, neurophilin1(NRP1). Recent studies have suggested that TAO kinase 2 (TAOK2) coordinates with NRP1 to direct basal dendrite growth by stimulating Jun Kinase (JNK). Knockdown of TAOK2 has been shown to decrease basal dendrite arborization and spinal density, whereas upregulation increases them. Stimulation of JNK by TAOK2 was shown to restore basal dendrite arborization in NRP-1-deficient neurons. Downregulation of Nrp1 results in a decrease in dendrite expression but this can also be rescued by overexpression of TAOK2.

== Dentate Granule Cells ==
=== Morphology ===
Typically, granule cells of the dentate gyrus have their axon protrude from the basal aspect of the soma and do not possess basal dendrites. However, a subset of granule cells in humans and primates has axons that extend from the main apical trunk and possess basal dendrites. In humans and rhesus monkey, basal dendrites were observed to either curve upward toward the molecular layer, mirroring the morphology of apical dendrites, or to extend downward toward the hilus. The hilar-directed dendrites are noticeably shorter and thinner, with minimal branching. Both forms of basal dendrites display spine densities similar to those of their apical counterparts. While the morphology of the cells in humans and rhesus is similar, the human brain is believed to contain a higher proportion of granule cells with basal dendrites. While initially believed to be a pathological trait in humans, further research confirmed that they are a normal morphological feature. However, an excessive number of granule cells possessing basal dendrites is associated with epilepsy. While mice possess granule cells with basal dendrites during development, these cells are rare in adulthood and are more commonly associated with pathological conditions such as epilepsy.

=== Function ===
While the functional role of granule cell basal dendrites in humans is not well-characterized. However, in healthy monkeys, granule cells with basal dendrites appear to exhibit functional recurrent excitation.

== Mitral cells ==
=== Morphology ===
Often referred to as lateral dendrites or secondary dendrites, the basal dendrites of mitral cells are often straight and extend radially from the cell body in a symmetric disk-like pattern. Each secondary dendrite is minimally branched, typically with only 2 to 4 branches. The length of a mitral cell's secondary dendrites decreases the closer the cell's soma is to the glomerular layer.

=== Synaptic input and integration ===
The basal dendrites of mitral cells synapse with granule cells of the olfactory bulb in the external plexiform layer (EPL), forming dendrodendritic synapses important for establishing local lateral inhibitory circuits involved in odor processing. At these synapses, glutamate is released by the mitral cells in a calcium-dependent manner, which then excites the granule cells, which in turn release GABA back onto the mitral cells, inhibiting them. This reciprocal signaling is proposed to synchronize mitral cell firing, narrow receptive fields, and enhance olfactory contrast.

=== Excitability ===
While mitral cells are glutamatergic, both GABA and glutamate receptors are present on their basal dendrites. The glutamate receptors present on these dendrites act as autoreceptors that respond to the glutamate release of nearby basal dendrites.
