= Martinotti cell =

Identifiers
- NeuroLex ID: nifext_55

Martinotti cells are small multipolar neurons with short branching dendrites. They are scattered throughout various layers of the cerebral cortex, sending their axons up to the cortical layer I where they form axonal arborization. The arbors transgress multiple columns in layer VI and make contacts with the distal tuft dendrites of pyramidal cells. Martinotti cells express somatostatin and sometimes calbindin, but not parvalbumin or vasoactive intestinal peptide. Furthermore, Martinotti cells in layer V of mouse cortex have been shown to express the nicotinic acetylcholine receptor α2 subunit (Chrna2), and preferably form reciprocal circuits with L5 extratelencephalic pyramidal neurons. They are commonly considered a subset of somatostatin (SST)-expressing interneurons.

Martinotti cells are associated with a cortical dampening mechanism. When the pyramidal neuron, which is the most common type of neuron in the cortex, starts getting overexcited, Martinotti cells start sending inhibitory signals to the surrounding neurons.

Historically, the discovery of Martinotti cells has been mistakenly attributed to Giovanni Martinotti 1888, although it is now accepted that they were actually discovered in 1889 by Carlo Martinotti (1859–1908), a student of Camillo Golgi.

== See also ==
- List of distinct cell types in the adult human body
