= Cellular neuroscience =

Branch of neuroscience

Cellular neuroscience is a branch of neuroscience concerned with the study of neurons at a cellular level. This includes morphology and physiological properties of single neurons. Several techniques such as intracellular recording, patch-clamp, and voltage-clamp technique, pharmacology, confocal imaging, molecular biology, two photon laser scanning microscopy and Ca^{2+} imaging have been used to study activity at the cellular level. Cellular neuroscience examines the various types of neurons, the functions of different neurons, the influence of neurons upon each other, and how neurons work together.

== Neurons and glial cells ==
Neurons are cells that are specialized to receive, propagate, and transmit electrochemical impulses. In the human brain alone, there are over eighty billion neurons. Neurons are diverse with respect to morphology and function. Thus, not all neurons correspond to the stereotypical motor neuron with dendrites and myelinated axons that conduct action potentials. Some neurons such as photoreceptor cells, for example, do not have myelinated axons that conduct action potentials. Other unipolar neurons found in invertebrates do not even have distinguishing processes such as dendrites. Moreover, the distinctions based on function between neurons and other cells such as cardiac and muscle cells are not helpful. Thus, the fundamental difference between a neuron and a nonneuronal cell is a matter of degree.

Another major class of cells found in the nervous system are glial cells. These cells are only recently beginning to receive attention from neurobiologists for being involved not just in nourishment and support of neurons, but also in modulating synapses. For example, Schwann cells, which are a type of glial cell found in the peripheral nervous system, modulate synaptic connections between presynaptic terminals of motor neuron endplates and muscle fibers at neuromuscular junctions.

== Neuronal function ==
One prominent characteristic of many neurons is excitability. Neurons generate electrical impulses or changes in voltage of two types: graded potentials and action potentials. Graded potentials occur when the membrane potential depolarizes and hyperpolarizes in a graded fashion relative to the amount of stimulus that is applied to the neuron. An action potential on the other hand is an all-or-none electrical impulse. Despite being slower than graded potentials, action potentials have the advantage of traveling long distances in axons with little or no decrement. Much of the current knowledge of action potentials comes from squid axon experiments by Sir Alan Lloyd Hodgkin and Sir Andrew Huxley.

== Action potential ==
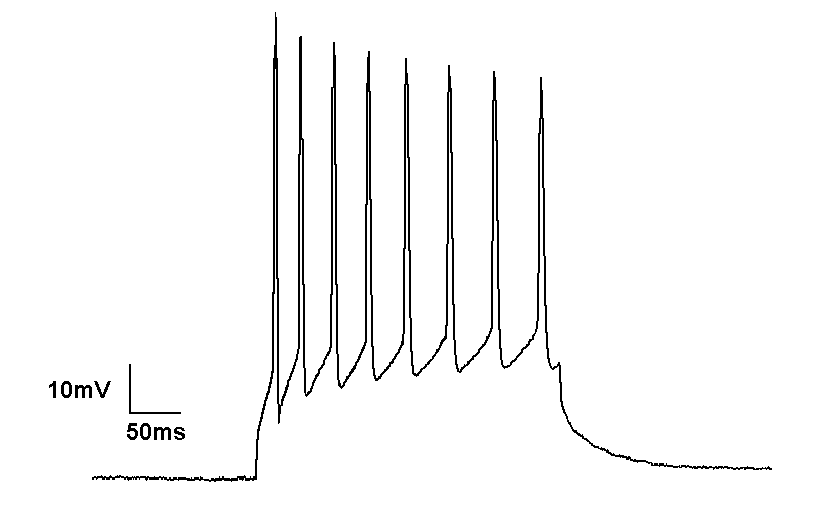
"Current Clamp" is a common technique in electrophysiology. This is a whole cell current clamp recording of a neuron firing a train of action potentials due to it being depolarized by current injection.

The Hodgkin–Huxley model of an action potential in the squid giant axon has been the basis for much of the current understanding of the ionic bases of action potentials. Briefly, the model states that the generation of an action potential is determined by two ions: Na^{+} and K^{+}. An action potential can be divided into several sequential phases: threshold, rising phase, falling phase, undershoot phase, and recovery. Following several local graded depolarizations of the membrane potential, the threshold of excitation is reached, voltage-gated sodium channels are activated, which leads to an influx of Na^{+} ions. As Na^{+} ions enter the cell, the membrane potential is further depolarized, and more voltage-gated sodium channels are activated. Such a process is also known as a positive feedback loop. As the rising phase reaches its peak, voltage-gated Na^{+} channels are inactivated whereas voltage-gated K^{+} channels are activated, resulting in a net outward movement of K^{+} ions, which re-polarizes the membrane potential towards the resting membrane potential. Repolarization of the membrane potential continues, resulting in an undershoot phase or absolute refractory period. The undershoot phase occurs because, unlike voltage-gated sodium channels, voltage-gated potassium channels inactivate much more slowly. Nevertheless, as more voltage-gated K^{+} channels become inactivated, the membrane potential recovers to its normal resting steady state.

== Structure and formation of synapses ==
Illustration of the major elements in a prototypical synapse. Synapses are gaps between nerve cells. These cells convert their electrical impulses into bursts of neurochemical relayers, called neurotransmitters, which travel across the synapses to receptors on the dendrites of adjacent cells, thereby triggering further electrical impulses to travel down the latter cells.

Neurons communicate with one another via synapses. Synapses are specialized junctions between two cells in close apposition to one another. In a synapse, the neuron that sends the signal is the presynaptic neuron and the target cell receives that signal is the postsynaptic neuron or cell. Synapses can be either electrical or chemical. Electrical synapses are characterized by the formation of gap junctions that allow ions and other organic compound to instantaneously pass from one cell to another. Chemical synapses are characterized by the presynaptic release of neurotransmitters that diffuse across a synaptic cleft to bind with postsynaptic receptors. A neurotransmitter is a chemical messenger that is synthesized within neurons themselves and released by these same neurons to communicate with their postsynaptic target cells. A receptor is a transmembrane protein molecule that a neurotransmitter or drug binds. Chemical synapses are slower than electrical synapses.

== Neurotransmitter transporters, receptors, and signaling mechanisms ==
After neurotransmitters are synthesized, they are packaged and stored in vesicles. These vesicles are pooled together in terminal boutons of the presynaptic neuron. When there is a change in voltage in the terminal bouton, voltage-gated calcium channels embedded in the membranes of these boutons become activated. These allow Ca^{2+} ions to diffuse through these channels and bind with synaptic vesicles within the terminal boutons. Once bounded with Ca^{2+}, the vesicles dock and fuse with the presynaptic membrane, and release neurotransmitters into the synaptic cleft by a process known as exocytosis. The neurotransmitters then diffuse across the synaptic cleft and bind to postsynaptic receptors embedded on the postsynaptic membrane of another neuron. There are two families of receptors: ionotropic and metabotropic receptors. Ionotropic receptors are a combination of a receptor and an ion channel. When ionotropic receptors are activated, certain ion species such as Na^{+} enter the postsynaptic neuron, which depolarizes the postsynaptic membrane. If more of the same type of postsynaptic receptors are activated, then more Na^{+} will enter the postsynaptic membrane and depolarize cell. Metabotropic receptors on the other hand activate second messenger cascade systems that result in the opening of ion channel located some place else on the same postsynaptic membrane. Although slower than ionotropic receptors that function as on-and-off switches, metabotropic receptors have the advantage of changing the cell's responsiveness to ions and other metabolites, examples being gamma amino-butyric acid (inhibitory transmitter), glutamic acid (excitatory transmitter), dopamine, norepinephrine, epinephrine, melanin, serotonin, melatonin, endorphins, dynorphins, nociceptin, and substance P.

Postsynaptic depolarizations can either transmit excitatory or inhibitory neurotransmitters. Those that release excitatory vesicles are referred to as excitatory postsynaptic potential (EPSP). Alternatively, inhibitory vesicles stimulate postsynaptic receptors such as to allow Cl^{−} ions to enter the cell or K^{+} ions to leave the cell, which results in an inhibitory postsynaptic potential (IPSP). If the EPSP is dominant, the threshold of excitation in the postsynaptic neuron may be reached, resulting in the generation of an action potential in the neuron(s) in turn postsynaptic to it, propagating the signal.

== Synaptic plasticity ==
Synaptic plasticity is the process whereby strengths of synaptic connections are altered. For example, long-term changes in synaptic connection may result in more postsynaptic receptors being embedded in the postsynaptic membrane, resulting in the strengthening of the synapse. Synaptic plasticity is also found to be the neural mechanism that underlies learning and memory. The basic properties, activity and regulation of membrane currents, synaptic transmission and synaptic plasticity, neurotransmission, neuroregensis, synaptogenesis and ion channels of cells are a few other fields studied by cellular neuroscientists. Tissue, cellular and subcellular anatomy are studied to provide insight into intellectual disability at the Mental Retardation Research Center MRRC Cellular Neuroscience Core. Journals such as Frontiers in Cellular Neuroscience and Molecular and Cellular Neuroscience are published regarding cellular neuroscientific topics.

== See also ==
- Action potential
- Calcium concentration microdomains
- Cell biology
- Cell signaling
- Chemical synapse
- Dendrite
- Hair cells
- IKK2
- Neuroendocrinology
- Neuropharmacology
- Pyramidal cells
- Soliton model
- Synaptotropic hypothesis
