= Hypolemmal cisternae =

The Hypolemmal cisternae is found within a perikaryon (cell body (soma) of a neuron not including the nucleus) and is a specialized part of the Smooth ER that extends into the dendrites and axon. Hypolemmal cisternae is found directly beneath the plasmalemma and is continuous with the Rough ER of the soma. Its function is unclear.
