= Neural backpropagation =

Neural phenomenon

Neural backpropagation is the phenomenon in which, after the action potential of a neuron creates a voltage spike down the axon (normal propagation), another impulse is generated from the soma and propagates towards the apical portions of the dendritic arbor or dendrites (from which much of the original input current originated). In addition to active backpropagation of the action potential, there is also passive electrotonic spread. While there is ample evidence to prove the existence of backpropagating action potentials, the function of such action potentials and the extent to which they invade the most distal dendrites remain highly controversial.

== Mechanism ==
Methods of neural backpropagation. Left: action potential forms in axon and travels towards soma. Right: Regular action potential generates an echo that backpropagates through the dendritic tree.

When the graded excitatory postsynaptic potentials (EPSPs) depolarize the soma to spike threshold at the axon hillock, first, the axon experiences a propagating impulse through the electrical properties of its voltage-gated sodium and voltage-gated potassium channels. An action potential occurs in the axon first as research illustrates that sodium channels at the dendrites exhibit a higher threshold than those on the membrane of the axon (Rapp et al., 1996). Moreover, the voltage-gated sodium channels on the dendritic membranes having a higher threshold helps prevent them triggering an action potential from synaptic input. Instead, only when the soma depolarizes enough from accumulating graded potentials and firing an axonal action potential will these channels be activated to propagate a signal traveling backwards (Rapp et al. 1996). Generally, EPSPs from synaptic activation are not large enough to activate the dendritic voltage-gated calcium channels (usually on the order of a couple milliamperes each) so backpropagation is typically believed to happen only when the cell is activated to fire an action potential. These sodium channels on the dendrites are abundant in certain types of neurons, especially mitral and pyramidal cells, and quickly inactivate. Initially, it was thought that an action potential could only travel down the axon in one direction (towards the axon terminal where it ultimately signaled the release of neurotransmitters). However, recent research has provided evidence for the existence of backwards-propagating action potentials (Staley 2004).

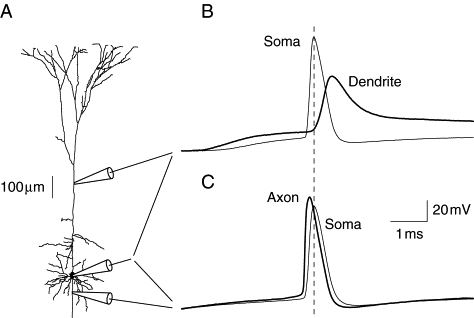
This diagram displays how the dendritic voltage spike comes after the depolarization of the axon and soma.

To elaborate, neural backpropagation can occur in one of two ways. First, during the initiation of an axonal action potential, the cell body, or soma, can become depolarized as well. This depolarization can spread through the cell body towards the dendritic tree where there are voltage-gated sodium channels. The depolarization of these voltage-gated sodium channels can then result in the propagation of a dendritic action potential. Such backpropagation is sometimes referred to as an echo of the forward propagating action potential (Staley 2004). It has also been shown that an action potential initiated in the axon can create a retrograde signal that travels in the opposite direction (Hausser 2000). This impulse travels up the axon eventually causing the cell body to become depolarized, thus triggering the dendritic voltage-gated calcium channels. As described in the first process, the triggering of dendritic voltage-gated calcium channels leads to the propagation of a dendritic action potential.

The strength of backpropagating action potentials varies greatly between different neuronal types (Hausser 2000). Some types of neuronal cells show little to no decrease in the amplitude of action potentials as they invade and travel through the dendritic tree while other neuronal cell types, such as cerebellar Purkinje neurons, exhibit very little action potential backpropagation (Stuart 1997). Additionally, there are other neuronal cell types that manifest varying degrees of amplitude decrement during backpropagation. It is thought that this is due to the fact that each neuronal cell type contains varying numbers of the voltage-gated channels required to propagate a dendritic action potential.

== Regulation and inhibition ==
Generally, synaptic signals that are received by the dendrite are combined in the soma in order to generate an action potential that is then transmitted down the axon toward the next synaptic contact. Thus, the backpropagation of action potentials poses a threat to initiate an uncontrolled positive feedback loop between the soma and the dendrites. For example, as an action potential was triggered, its dendritic echo could enter the dendrite and potentially trigger a second action potential. If left unchecked, an endless cycle of action potentials triggered by their own echo would be created. In order to prevent such a cycle, most neurons have a relatively high density of A-type K+ channels.

A-type K+ channels belong to the superfamily of voltage-gated ion channels and are transmembrane channels that help maintain the cell's membrane potential (Cai 2007). Typically, they play a crucial role in returning the cell to its resting membrane following an action potential by allowing an inhibitory current of K+ ions to quickly flow out of the neuron. The presence of these channels in such high density in the dendrites explains their inability to initiate an action potential, even during synaptic input. Additionally, the presence of these channels provides a mechanism by which the neuron can suppress and regulate the backpropagation of action potentials through the dendrite (Vetter 2000). Pharmacological antagonists of these channels promoted the frequency of backpropagating action potentials which demonstrates their importance in keeping the cell from excessive firing (Waters et al., 2004). Results have indicated a linear increase in the density of A-type channels with increasing distance into the dendrite away from the soma. The increase in the density of A-type channels results in a dampening of the backpropagating action potential as it travels into the dendrite. Essentially, inhibition occurs because the A-type channels facilitate the outflow of K+ ions in order to maintain the membrane potential below threshold levels (Cai 2007). Such inhibition limits EPSP and protects the neuron from entering a never-ending positive-positive feedback loop between the soma and the dendrites.

== History ==
Since the 1950s, evidence has existed that neurons in the central nervous system generate an action potential, or voltage spike, that travels both through the axon to signal the next neuron and backpropagates through the dendrites sending a retrograde signal to its presynaptic signaling neurons. This current decays significantly with travel length along the dendrites, so effects are predicted to be more significant for neurons whose synapses are near the postsynaptic cell body, with magnitude depending mainly on sodium-channel density in the dendrite. It is also dependent on the shape of the dendritic tree and, more importantly, on the rate of signal currents to the neuron. On average, a backpropagating spike loses about half its voltage after traveling nearly 500 micrometres.

Backpropagation occurs actively in the neocortex, hippocampus, substantia nigra, and spinal cord, while in the cerebellum it occurs relatively passively. This is consistent with observations that synaptic plasticity is much more apparent in areas like the hippocampus, which controls spatial memory, than the cerebellum, which controls more unconscious and vegetative functions.

The backpropagating current also causes a voltage change that increases the concentration of Ca^{2+} in the dendrites, an event which coincides with certain models of synaptic plasticity. This change also affects future integration of signals, leading to at least a short-term response difference between the presynaptic signals and the postsynaptic spike.

== Functions ==
While many questions have yet to be answered in regards to neural backpropagation, there exists a number of hypotheses regarding its function. Some proposed function include involvement in synaptic plasticity, involvement in dendrodendritic inhibition, boosting synaptic responses, resetting membrane potential, retrograde actions at synapses and conditional axonal output. Backpropagation is believed to help form LTP (long term potentiation) and Hebbian plasticity at hippocampal synapses. Since artificial LTP induction, using microelectrode stimulation, voltage clamp, etc. requires the postsynaptic cell to be slightly depolarized when EPSPs are elicited, backpropagation can serve as the means of depolarization of the postsynaptic cell.

Backpropagating action potentials can induce Long-term potentiation by behaving as a signal that informs the presynaptic cell that the postsynaptic cell has fired. Moreover, Spike-Time Dependent Plasticity is known as the narrow time frame for which coincidental firing of both the pre and post synaptic neurons will induce plasticity. Neural backpropagation occurs in this window to interact with NMDA receptors at the apical dendrites by assisting in the removal of voltage sensitive Mg2+ block (Waters et al., 2004). This process permits the large influx of calcium which provokes a cascade of events to cause potentiation.

Current literature also suggests that backpropagating action potentials are also responsible for the release of retrograde neurotransmitters and trophic factors which contribute to the short-term and long-term efficacy between two neurons. Since the backpropagating action potentials essentially exhibit a copy of the neurons axonal firing pattern, they help establish a synchrony between the pre and post synaptic neurons (Waters et al., 2004).

Importantly, backpropagating action potentials are necessary for the release of Brain-Derived Neurotrophic Factor (BDNF). BDNF is an essential component for inducing synaptic plasticity and development (Kuczewski N., Porcher C., Ferrand N., 2008). Moreover, backpropagating action potentials have been shown to induce BDNF-dependent phosphorylation of cyclic AMP response element-binding protein (CREB) which is known to be a major component in synaptic plasticity and memory formation (Kuczewski N., Porcher C., Lessmann V., et al. 2008).

== Algorithm ==
While a backpropagating action potential can presumably cause changes in the weight of the presynaptic connections, there is no simple mechanism for an error signal to propagate through multiple layers of neurons, as in the computer backpropagation algorithm. However, simple linear topologies have shown that effective computation is possible through signal backpropagation in this biological sense.
