= Spike directivity =

Spike directivity is a vector that quantifies changes in transient charge density during action potential propagation.

Electrophysiologists have observed that action potentials cannot be treated as a digital signal, and the shape of recorded action potentials changes in time. Recent experimental evidence has shown that action potentials in neurons are subject to waveform modulation while they travel down axons or dendrites. The action potential waveform can be modulated by neuron geometry, local alterations in the ion conductance, and other biophysical properties including neurotransmitter release.

== See also ==
- Cellular neuroscience
- Neuron
- NeuroElectroDynamics
