= Perlia's nucleus =

Nucleus located in the midbrain of some animals

Perlia's nucleus, also known as nucleus of Perlia and abbreviated as NP, is a spindle-shaped nucleus located in the mesencephalon, a subdivision of the Edinger-Westphal nucleus situated between the right and left oculomotor nuclei. It is implicated in parasympathetic oculomotor functions, possibly including input to the iris and ciliary. Perlia's nucleus is believed to be a characteristic found exclusively in animals capable of binocular vision. Moreover, it might be an exclusive characteristic of humans, as indicated by a systematic study of monkey brains, where only 9% exhibited a clear midline group, potentially corresponding to the NP.

In 1891, Perlia's nucleus was identified as a central mediator for the convergent movement of the eyes based on clinical findings in ophthalmospegias. It has also recently been attributed an important role in the upward movement or gaze of the eyes.

== Structure ==
=== Histological Properties ===
This spindle-shaped nucleus is formed by groups of cholinergic motor neurons. It has multipolar cells in its lower part but bipolar club and spindle-shaped cells are more common in its upper part. Vegetative cells similar to those found in the chief nucleus have also been observed. Cells in the NP are arranged in parallel lines that are ventro-dorsally oriented. Those located in its ventral part have been described as being histologically similar to those in the chief nucleus.

== Eponym ==
The nucleus is named after german physician and ophtalmologist Richard Perlia, who first described its existence in 1889.

== See also ==
- Edinger–Westphal nucleus
