= Coincidence detection in neurobiology =

Neurological process

Coincidence detection is a process by which neurons identify and respond to a multiple input signals that arrive simultaneously, or within a narrow timeframe, to the same location. Coincidence detection acts as a filter to distinguish difference in the precise timing of action potentials being sent to the same location. Coincidence detection influence the processing of information by reducing variation in timing of action potential spikes. This allows the creation of variable associations between distinct signals.

== Principles of Coincidence Detection ==
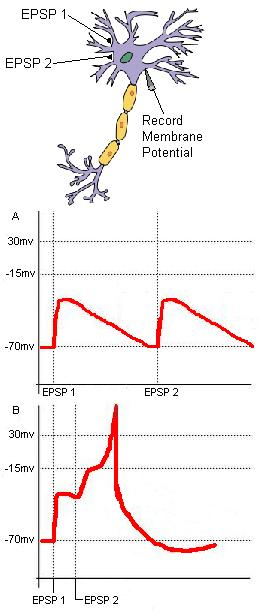
Fig. 1: Spatial and temporal summation. Two EPSPs innervated in rapid succession sum to produce a larger EPSP, or an action potential in the postsynaptic cell.

Coincidence detection relies on the management of the precise timing of multiple input signals arriving at the same neuron. The process of managing these signals is crucial for proper action potential propagation. If two inputs arrive too far apart from each other, the depolarization of the first input could drop too much, which can prevent an action potential from occurring once the second input arrives. Additionally, if too many inputs arrive at the same time, this could result in an increased, often intense, depolarization of the neuron. If this depolarization crosses the threshold, it could trigger an action potential too early. This could then result in an increased firing rate of action potentials.

== Distal Coincidence Detection ==
Distal coincidence detection occurs by pyramidal cells that detect nearly simultaneous inputs from different cortical layers at distal dendrites, combining top-down signaling with bottom-up activity.

There is a nonlinear interaction that occurs between back-propagating action potentials (bAPs) and incoming excitatory postsynaptic potentials (EPSPs) leading to amplified synaptic strength.

The specific mechanism of distal coincidence detectors enables neurons to detect specific and meaningful patterns within neuron activity as opposed to simply summing all of the inputs together.

The molecular basis of distal coincidence detection is based on NMDARs acting as the molecular coincidence detector. This is seen when NMDARs remove their Mg^{2+} blocks only when both depolarization, from bAPs, and glutamate release, from the inputs, coincide with one another.

== Coincidence Detection in Sound Localization ==
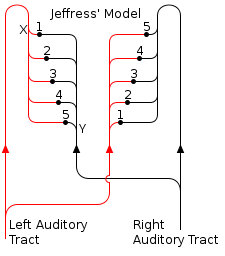
Fig. 2: If a sound arrives at the left ear before the right ear, the impulse in the left auditory tract will reach X sooner than the impulse in the right auditory tract reaches Y. Neurons 4 or 5 may therefore receive coincident inputs.

Coincidence detection has been shown to be a major factor in sound localization. This is often the most common, and easiest understood example of coincidence detection often seen in neurobiology. When someone hears a sound, there is a potential that the sound waves could be arriving at the ears at different times. This difference in arrival time is referred to as an interaural time difference (ITD). Due to differing lengths within axons, different coincidence detector neurons will fire when sound comes from different positions relative to the time it takes for the sound to travel through the auditory nerve tract. A model proposing that two signals arriving from an asynchronous arrival of sound to the cochlea of each ear will converge synchronously on a coincidence detector in the auditory cortex based on the magnitude of the ITD (Fig. 2). Sensory information from the hair cells of the ears travels to the ipsilateral nucleus magnocellularis. From here, the signals project ipsilaterally and contralaterally to two nuclei. Each nucleus contains coincidence detectors that receives auditory input from the left and the right ear. Since the ipsilateral axons enter the nuclei dorsally, while the contralateral axons enter ventrally, sounds from various positions directly correspond to stimulation of different depths of the nuclei. From this information, a neural map of auditory space was formed. The function of the nuclei found in the brainstem of an owl compares to that of the medial superior olive in mammals.

== Synaptic Plasticity and Associativity ==
In 1949, Donald Hebb proposed a theory about synaptic efficiency increasing through repeated and persistent stimulation of a postsynaptic neuron from a presynaptic neuron. This is often informally summarized as "cells that fire together, wire together". The theory was validated in part by the discovery of long-term potentiation. Studies of LTP on multiple presynaptic cells stimulating a postsynaptic neuron helped further validate a property of associativity. However, a weak neuronal stimulation onto a pyramidal neuron might not induce long-term potentiation. But, this same stimulation paired with an additional, simultaneous stimulation from a second neuron could strengthen both synapses.

Synaptic plasticity can be best defined as the brain's ability to strengthen or weaken the synaptic connections between neurons. This is often done over a period of time as well as in response to activity/activation of neurons. Synaptic plasticity is crucial to the formation of the foundation towards learning and memory. Synaptic plasticity can either result in long-term potentiation (LTP) or long-term depression (LTD). Additionally, synaptic plasticity also involves short (sub-second) and long-term (hours-days) changes.

Long-term potentiation refers to the strengthening of the synaptic connection between neurons. Long-term depression refers to the decrease in synaptic connections. Both of these processes work in tandem to ensure that new information can be encoded. For example, if synapses were to simply continuously increase in strength as a result of LTP, then there would be an eventual level of maximum efficacy. This makes it difficult to encode new information within the brain. LTD is necessary to remove old, non-pertinent information, to make space for new synaptic connections to form.

=== Molecular Mechanism of Long-Term Potentiation (LTP) ===
LTP results from the interplay of two postsynaptic receptors, NMDA and AMPA, which are both activated by glutamate. The opening of the NMDA receptor requires a slight depolarization that can expel the Mg^{2+} block on the receptor. The removal of the Mg^{2+} block allows the flow of Ca^{2+} into the cell. Additionally, removal of the Mg^{2+} can also occur with co-occurring AMPA activation. The opening of these receptors results in a signaling cascade that begins with the influx of calcium into the cells. Eventually, repeated activation of these receptors will result in an accumulation of AMPA receptors on the postsynaptic neuron, which will increase the size of the excitatory current, thereby increasing the likelihood of an action potential to occur. As a result, both synapses strengthen. Associativity becomes a factor because this can be achieved through two simultaneous inputs that may not be strong enough to activate LTP by themselves.

Besides the NMDA-receptor based processes, further cellular mechanisms allow for the association between two different input signals converging on the same neuron in a defined timeframe. Upon the simultaneous increase in the intracellular concentrations of cAMP and Ca^{2+}, a transcriptional co-activator called TORC1 (CRTC1) becomes activated, which converts the temporal coincidence of the two second messengers into long term changes, such as LTP. This cellular mechanism, through adenylate cyclase activation, could also account for the detection of the repetitive stimulation of a given synapse. Adenylyl cyclase has been implicated in memory formation as a potential coincidence detector.

=== Molecular Mechanism of Long-Term Depression (LTD) ===
Long-term depression also works through associative properties and is often seen as a reverse process to LTP. LTD refers to the selective weakening of synaptic connections. LTD occurs during periods of long, low-frequency stimulations. This activity depresses EPSPs for several hours, and can erase the increase in EPSP size resulting from LTP. Like LTP, LTD also requires activation of NMDA-glutamate receptors alongside the resulting calcium influx into the postsynaptic neuron. LTD occurs when there is a small rise in [Ca^{2+}], rather than the large Ca^{2+} influx seen in LTP. Additionally, LTD can also occur due to the activation of Ca^{2+}-dependent phosphatases, which cleave the phosphate groups from target molecules.

== See also ==
- Coincidence circuit
- Earth Coincidence Control Office
- Hebbian theory
- Long-term depression
- Long-term potentiation
- Neurobiology
- Neuroethology
- Quantum mind
- Sound localization
