= Dendrite =

Small projection on a neuron that receives signals

Identifiers
- MeSH: D003712
- FMA: 67314

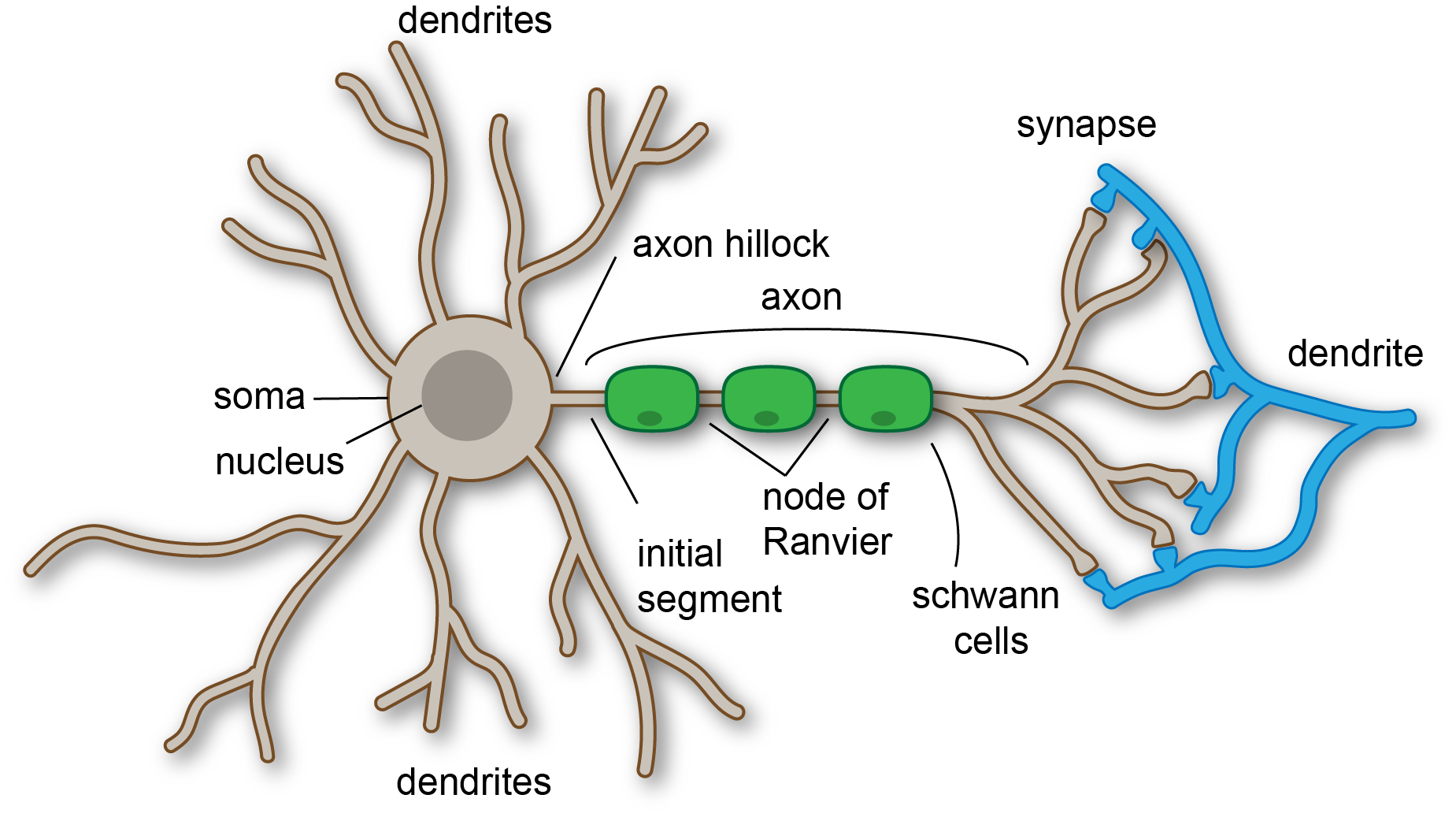
The neuron contains dendrites that receive information, a cell body called the soma, and an axon that sends information to other cells through the synapses. Schwann cells make the signals (action potentials) move faster down the axon. The dendrites of a neighboring neuron are shown in blue.

A dendrite or dendron (from Ancient Greek δένδρον (déndron) 'tree') is a branched cytoplasmic process extending from a nerve cell; it propagates the electrochemical stimulation received from other neural cells to the cell body, or soma, of the neuron from which the dendrites project. Electrical stimulation is transmitted onto dendrites by upstream neurons (usually via their axons) via synapses which are located at various points throughout the dendritic tree.

Dendrites play a critical role in integrating these synaptic inputs and in determining the extent to which action potentials are produced by the neuron.

== Structure and function ==
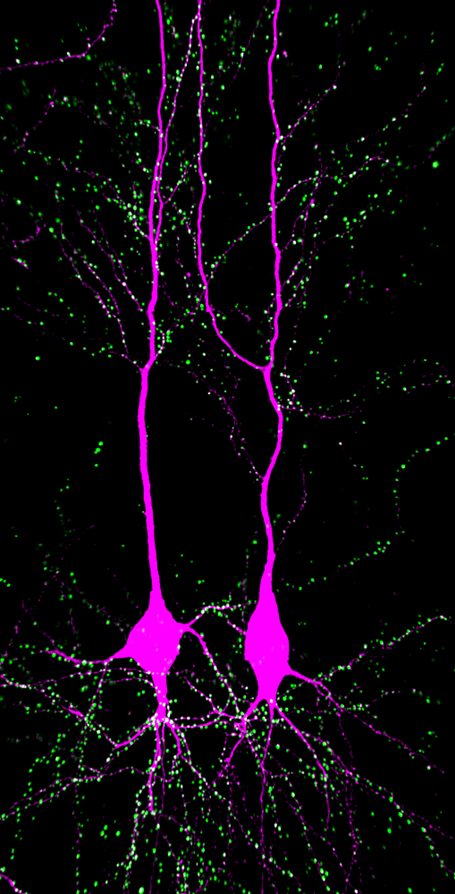
The extensive dendritic tree of two hippocampal pyramidal neurons (magenta) with all incoming synapses genetically labeled (green spots).

Dendrites are one of two types of cytoplasmic processes that extrude from the cell body of a neuron, the other type being an axon. Axons can be distinguished from dendrites by several features including shape, length, and function. Dendrites often taper off in shape and are shorter, while axons tend to maintain a constant radius and can be very long. Typically, axons transmit electrochemical signals while dendrites receive the electrochemical signals, although, some types of neurons in certain species lack specialized axons and transmit signals via their dendrites. Dendrites provide an enlarged surface area to receive signals from axon terminals of other neurons. The dendrite of a large pyramidal cell receives signals from about 30,000 presynaptic neurons. Excitatory synapses terminate on dendritic spines, tiny protrusions from the dendrite with a high density of neurotransmitter receptors. Most inhibitory synapses directly contact the dendritic shaft.

Synaptic activity causes local changes in the electrical potential across the plasma membrane of the dendrite. This change in membrane potential will passively spread along the dendrite, but becomes weaker with distance without an action potential. To generate an action potential, many excitatory synapses have to be active at the same time, leading to strong depolarization of the dendrite and the cell body (soma). The action potential, which typically starts at the axon hillock, propagates down the length of the axon to the axon terminals where it triggers the release of neurotransmitters. Furthermore, if the signal moves backwards into the dendrite, it is retrograde propagation, which provides an important signal for spike-timing-dependent plasticity (STDP).

Most synapses are axodendritic, involving an axon signaling to a dendrite. There are also dendrodendritic synapses, signaling from one dendrite to another. An autapse is a synapse in which the axon of one neuron transmits signals to its own dendrite.

The general structure of the dendrite is used to classify neurons into multipolar, bipolar, and unipolar types. Multipolar neurons are composed of one axon and many dendritic trees. Pyramidal cells are multipolar cortical neurons with pyramid-shaped cell bodies and large dendrites that extend towards the surface of the cortex (apical dendrite). Bipolar neurons have two main dendrites at opposing ends of the cell body. Many inhibitory neurons have this morphology. Unipolar neurons, typical for insects, have a stalk that extends from the cell body, separating into two branches with one containing the dendrites and the other with the terminal buttons. In vertebrates, sensory neurons detecting touch or temperature are unipolar. Dendritic branching can be extensive and in some cases is sufficient to receive as many as 100,000 inputs to a single neuron.

Neurons grow dendrites in highly specific shapes that determine which inputs are received and processed; in simple terms: structure leads to function. Additionally, small molecular changes can have a significant change in functions that can contribute to developmental disorders. Different dendritic cell types use mechanisms in distinct ways to generate diverse dendritic trees that connect the nervous system.

Specific lipids are important in the process of mechanisms in dendrites. Glycerophospholipids and their interacting proteins are a specific lipid that is crucial in the initiation and elongation that is involved in the growth of dendritic spines and branches. While the mechanism that supports dendritic branching isn't entirely understood, phosphoinositides (PIPs) in the plasma membrane have been found to be a key factor in shaping dendrites by downstream signaling.

== History ==
The term dendrites was first used in 1889 by Wilhelm His to describe the number of smaller "protoplasmic processes" that were attached to a nerve cell. German anatomist, Otto Friedrich Karl Deiters, is generally credited with the discovery of the axon by distinguishing it from the dendrites.

Some of the first intracellular recordings in a nervous system were made in the late 1930s by Kenneth S. Cole and Howard J. Curtis. Swiss Rüdolf Albert von Kölliker and German Robert Remak were the first to identify and characterize the axonal initial segment. Alan Hodgkin and Andrew Huxley also employed the squid giant axon in 1939, and by 1952, they had obtained a full quantitative description of the ionic basis of the action potential, leading to the formulation of the Hodgkin–Huxley model. Hodgkin and Huxley were jointly awarded the Nobel Prize for this work in 1963. The formulas detailing axonal conductance were extended to vertebrates in the Frankenhaeuser–Huxley equations. Louis-Antoine Ranvier was the first to describe the gaps or nodes found on axons and for this contribution, these axonal features are now commonly referred to as the Nodes of Ranvier. Santiago Ramón y Cajal, a Spanish anatomist, proposed that axons were the output components of neurons. He also proposed that neurons were discrete cells that communicated with each other via specialized junctions, or spaces between cells, now known as a synapse. Ramón y Cajal improved a silver staining process known as Golgi's method, which had been developed by his rival, Camillo Golgi.

== Dendrite development ==

During the development of dendrites, several factors can influence differentiation. These include modulation of sensory input, environmental pollutants, body temperature, and drug use. For example, rats raised in dark environments were found to have a reduced number of spines in their pyramidal cells located in the primary visual cortex and a marked change in distribution of dendrite branching in layer 4 stellate cells. Experiments performed in vitro and in vivo have shown that the presence of afferents and input activity can modulate the patterns in which dendrites differentiate.

Little is known about the process by which dendrites orient themselves in vivo and are compelled to create the intricate branching pattern unique to each specific neuronal class. One theory on the mechanism of dendritic arbor development is the synaptotropic hypothesis. The synaptotropic hypothesis proposes that input from a presynaptic to a postsynaptic cell, and maturation of excitatory synaptic inputs, eventually can change the course of synapse formation at dendritic and axonal arbors.

This synapse formation is required for the development of neuronal structure in the functioning brain. A balance between metabolic costs of dendritic elaboration and the need to cover the receptive field presumably determine the size and shape of dendrites. A complex array of extracellular and intracellular cues modulate dendrite development - including transcription factors, receptor-ligand interactions, various signaling pathways, local translational machinery, cytoskeletal elements, golgi outposts, and endosomes. These contribute to the organization of the dendrites on individual cell bodies and the placement of these dendrites in the neuronal circuitry. For example, it was shown that β-actin zip code binding protein 1 (ZBP1), contributes to proper dendritic branching.

Dendritic arborization has been found to be induced in cerebellum Purkinje cells by substance P. Important secretory and endocytic pathways controlling the dendritic development include DAR3 /SAR1, DAR2/Sec23, DAR6/Rab1, etc.... All these molecules interplay with each other in controlling dendritic morphogenesis including the acquisition of type specific dendritic arborization, the regulation of dendrite size and the organization of dendrites emanating from different neurons.

== Types of dendritic patterns ==
Dendritic arborization, also known as dendritic branching, is a multi-step biological process by which neurons form new dendritic trees and branches to create new synapses. Dendrites in many organisms assume different morphological patterns of branching. The morphology of dendrites such as branch density and grouping patterns are highly correlated to the function of the neuron. Malformation of dendrites is also tightly correlated to impaired nervous system function.

Branching morphologies may assume an adendritic structure (not having a branching structure, or not tree-like), or a tree-like radiation structure. Tree-like arborization patterns can be spindled (where two dendrites radiate from opposite poles of a cell body with few branches, see bipolar neurons ), spherical (where dendrites radiate in a part or in all directions from a cell body, see cerebellar granule cells), laminar (where dendrites can either radiate planarly, offset from cell body by one or more stems, or multi-planarly, see retinal horizontal cells, retinal ganglion cells, retinal amacrine cells respectively), cylindrical (where dendrites radiate in all directions in a cylinder, disk-like fashion, see pallidal neurons), conical (dendrites radiate like a cone away from cell body, see pyramidal cells), or fanned (where dendrites radiate like a flat fan as in Purkinje cells).

== Electrical Properties ==
The structure and branching of a neuron's dendrites, as well as the availability and variation of voltage-gated ion conductance, strongly influences how the neuron integrates the input from other neurons. This integration is both temporal, involving the summation of stimuli that arrive in rapid succession, as well as spatial, entailing the aggregation of excitatory and inhibitory inputs from separate branches.

Dendrites were once thought to merely convey electrical stimulation passively. This passive transmission means that voltage changes measured at the cell body are the result of activation of distal synapses propagating the electric signal towards the cell body without the aid of voltage-gated ion channels. Passive cable theory describes how voltage changes at a particular location on a dendrite transmit this electrical signal through a system of converging dendrite segments of different diameters, lengths, and electrical properties. Based on passive cable theory one can track how changes in a neuron's dendritic morphology impact the membrane voltage at the cell body, and thus how variation in dendrite architectures affects the overall output characteristics of the neuron. Dendrite radius has notable effects on resistance to electrical current, which in turn affects conduction time and speed. Dendrite branching optimizes of energy efficiency while maintaining functional connectivity by minimizing power and emphasizing effective signal transmission, supporting their roles in signal integration over longer times. This behavior seen in dendrites differs from that in axons, which give more priority to conduction time (and speed). Such tradeoffs influence overall neuronal structures, leading to a scaling relationship between conduction time and body size.

Action potentials initiated at the axon hillock propagate back into the dendritic arbor. These back-propagating action potentials depolarize the dendritic membrane and provide a crucial signal for synapse modulation and long-term potentiation. Back-propagation is not completely passive, but modulated by the presence of dendritic voltage-gated potassium channels. Furthermore, in certain types of neurons, a train of back-propagating action potentials can induce a calcium action potential (a dendritic spike) at dendritic initiation zones.

== Neurotransmitter release ==
Dendrites release a multitude of neuroactive substances that are not confined to specific neurotransmitter class, signaling molecule, or brain area. Dendrites are seen releasing neurotransmitters such as dopamine, GABA, and glutamate in a retrograde fashion. In the hypothalamo-neurohypophysial peptide system, oxytocin, and vasopressin (antidiuretic hormone or ADH) are notable neuropeptides that are released from the dendrites of magnocellular neurosecretory cells (MCNs), allowing them to quickly enter the bloodstream. Paraventricular nuclei also release oxytocin and ADH from dendrites, allowing for the regulation of the anterior pituitary gland, as well as modulation of the parasympathetic and sympathetic changes in organs such as the heart and kidneys. This is done by parvocellular neurosecretory and parvocellular preautonomic neurons, respectively. In the nigrostriatal and mesolimbic systems, dopamine is released from dendrites in midbrain dopamine neurons, influencing reward and emotion processing, as well as learning and memory. Loss of dopamine from in the nigrostriatal pathway affects neuronal activity from the basal ganglia, therefore playing a role in the onset of neurodegenerative diseases such as Parkinson's. Dendritic release of oxytocin, ADH, and dopamine have been found to have both autocrine and paracrine effects on the neuron itself (and nearby glia), as well as on afferent nerve terminals.

Through dendrites complex, polarized structures, changes are closely linked to many neurodegenerative diseases. Due to the necessity of dendrites for neural function, damage and abnormalities in these components are likely to play a key role in disease development. Dendritic growth under normal conditions such as cytoskeletal elements and organelles within dendrites contribute to the knowledge of disruption in these components that lead to neurodegenerative pathologies.

== Plasticity ==
Dendrites themselves appear to be capable of plastic changes during the adult life of animals, including invertebrates. Neuronal dendrites have various compartments known as functional units that are able to compute incoming stimuli. These functional units are involved in processing input and are composed of the subdomains of dendrites such as spines, branches, or groupings of branches. Therefore, plasticity that leads to changes in the dendrite structure will affect communication and processing in the cell. During development, dendrite morphology is shaped by intrinsic programs within the cell's genome and extrinsic factors such as signals from other cells. However, in adult life, extrinsic signals become more influential and cause more significant changes in dendrite structure compared to intrinsic signals during development. In females, the dendritic structure can change as a result of physiological conditions induced by hormones during periods such as pregnancy, lactation, and following the estrous cycle. This is particularly visible in pyramidal cells of the CA1 region of the hippocampus, where the density of dendrites can vary up to 30%.

Recent experimental observations suggest that adaptation is performed in the neuronal dendritic trees, where the timescale of adaptation was observed to be as low as several seconds. Certain machine learning architectures based on dendritic trees have been shown to simplify the learning algorithm without affecting performance.

== Other functions and properties ==
Most excitatory neurons receive synaptic inputs across their dendritic branches, which results in electrical and biochemical compartmentalization, allowing for a phenomenon known as dendritic spikes, where local regenerative potentials contribute to plasticity. In pyramidal neurons dendritic trees have two main functions that allow them to demonstrate an electrical and biochemical compartmentalization that may integrate synaptic inputs prior to transmission to the soma, as well as make up computation units in the brain. The first main function allows for differential synaptic processing due to distribution of synaptic inputs across the dendritic branches. The processing of these synaptic inputs often involve feedforward or feedback mechanisms that vary based on the type of neuron or brain region. The opposite but combined functions of feedforward and feedback processes at different times is proposed to associate different information streams that determine neural selectivity to different stimuli.

The second function of dendritic trees in this regard is their ability to shape signal propagation that allows for sub-cellular compartmentalization. Large depolarizations can lead to local regenerative potentials, which may allow neurons to transition from stages of isolated dendritic events (segregation) to combined dendritic events (integration). Dendritic compartmentalization has implications in information processing, where it serves as a foundation of trans-neuron signaling, processing stimuli, computation, neuronal expressivity, and mitigating neuronal noise. Likewise, this phenomenon also underlies the storage of information by optimizing learning capacity and storage capacity. In other types of neurons, such as those of the medial superior olive, have differing dendritic properties that allow for coincidence detection. In contrast, in retinal ganglion cells, dendritic integration is used for computing directional selectivity, allowing neurons to respond to direction of movement. Therefore dendritic trees serve various purposes in integrating and processing various different types of stimuli and underlie various neurological processes.

== Clinical implications of dysfunction ==
Dendrite dysfunction and alterations in dendrite morphology may contribute to many neuropathies and diseases. Changes in dendrite morphology may include alterations in branching patterns, fragmentation, loss of branching, and alterations in spine morphology and number. Such abnormalities contribute to a wide range of neurodevelopmental and neurodegenerative disorders such as autism spectrum disorders (ASDs), schizophrenia, down syndrome, fragile X syndrome, Alzheimer's disease (AD), and more. For example, subjects with ASD were observed to have reduced dendrite branching in the CA1 and CA4 regions of the hippocampus, in addition to increased spine density. In Rett Syndrome, researchers have observed less dendrite branching in the basal dendrites of the motor cortex and subiculum. In schizophrenic patients, reduced dendritic arbor (the tree-like network of dendrites) and spine density were observed. In addition to psychological and neurodevelopmental disorders, dendrite dysfunction has also been seen to have implications in onset of neurodegenerative diseases such as Alzheimer's. Alzheimer's patients have been observed to have significant changes in dendritic arbor, as well as smaller dendrite lengths in the apical and basal trees of the CA1a and CA1b areas of the hippocampus. As such, there is much continuous research exploring the effects of dysfunction in dendritic branching and morphology, and scientists continue to expand their study in this field to better understand the basis of various neurological disorders.
