= Molecular and Cellular Neuroscience =

- Discipline: Neuroscience
- Language: English
- Edited by: Mathias Bähr

Publication details
- Former names: Molecular and Cellular Neurosciences
- History: 1990-present
- Publisher: Elsevier
- Frequency: Bimonthly
- Impact factor: 4.626 (2021)

Standard abbreviations
- ISO 4: Mol. Cell. Neurosci.

Indexing
- ISSN: 1044-7431
- OCLC no.: 80367358

Links
- Journal homepage; Online archive

Molecular and Cellular Neuroscience is a bimonthly peer-reviewed scientific journal covering all aspects of neurosciences. The editors-in-chief are Mathias Bähr (University of Göttingen), Alain Chédotal (Sorbonne University), Henrik Zetterberg (University of Gothenburg), and Noam E. Ziv (Technion). According to the Journal Citation Reports, the journal has a 2021 impact factor of 4.626.
