= Apical dendrite =

Type of dendrite found at the apex of cortical pyramidal cell pathways

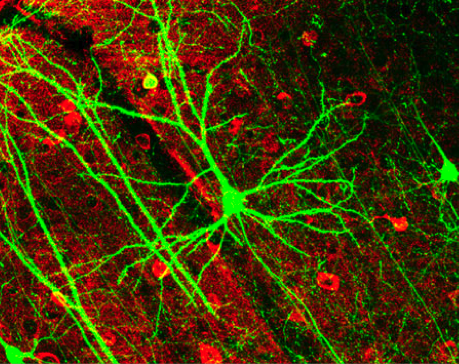
GFP expressing pyramydal cell in mouse cortex

An apical dendrite is a dendrite that emerges from the apex of a pyramidal cell. Apical dendrites are one of two primary categories of dendrites, and they distinguish the pyramidal cells from spiny stellate cells in the cortices. Pyramidal cells are found in the prefrontal cortex, the hippocampus, the entorhinal cortex, the olfactory cortex, and other areas. Dendrite arbors formed by apical dendrites are the means by which synaptic inputs into a cell are integrated. The apical dendrites in these regions contribute significantly to memory, learning, and sensory associations by modulating the excitatory and inhibitory signals received by the pyramidal cells.

== Background ==
Two types of dendrites present on pyramidal cells are apical and basal dendrites. Apical dendrites are the most distal along the ascending trunk, and reside in layer 1. These distal apical dendrites receive synaptic input from related cortical as well as globally modulatory subcortical projections. Basal dendrites include shorter radially distributed dendrites which receive input from local pyramidal cells and interneurons. Pyramidal neurons segregate their inputs using proximal and apical dendrites.

Apical dendrites are studied in many ways. In cellular analysis, the electrical properties of the dendrite are studied using stimulus responses. A single surface shock of the cerebral cortex induces a 10–20 ms negative potential, a manifestation of the summed excitatory post-synaptic potentials (EPSPs) evoked in the distal portions of the apical dendrite. This has been called the dendritic spike.

== Areas of interest ==
=== Hippocampus ===
The hippocampus contains pyramidal neurons in three areas: CA1, CA2, and CA3. The pyramidal neurons of each area have different properties. However, in all areas, dendritic synthesis of proteins is necessary for late long-term potentials in the hippocampal neurons. Neurons throughout the limbic system are known to have "burst" properties. These cells undergo synchronous and paroxysmal depolarizations, firing short sequences of action potentials called bursts.

The stratum oriens is the location between layers containing basal dendrites. The stratum lucidum, stratum radiatum, and the stratum moleculare-lacunosum are layers of apical dendrites and are ordered from least distant to most distant from the soma of the neuron.

==== Pyramidal cells in CA3 ====
CA3 projects Schaffer collaterals to apical dendrites in CA1. Individual pyramidal cells in the CA3 region have burst properties due to high densities of calcium channels in their proximal dendrites. Depolarization of the membrane may also trigger these bursts. Calcium entry into the cell causes more prolonged depolarization and increased action potentials. Usually curtailed by the hyperpolarizing local inhibition (due to the excitatory collateral system), this can lead to gradual recruitment of CA3 neurons and result in synchronized burst discharges. After hyperpolarization by calcium-dependent potassium conductance is also used as a method of controlling these bursts.

Hippocampal CA3 pyramidal cells have complex dendritic arbors which receive a stratified pattern of synaptic input from a variety of sources, including:

1. the commissural/associational fibers from ipsi- and contra-lateral CA3 pyramidal neurons which synapse on both the basal and mid-apical dendrites in the stratum oriens and stratum radiatum
2. the mossy fibers from the granule cells of the dentate gyrus which synapse on the most proximal apical region, the stratum lucidum
3. the preforant path fibers from the entorhinal cortical pyramidal cells which synapse in the region of the most distal apical dendrites, the stratum lacunosum-moleculare.

Distal apical dendrites extend upwards from the soma. The shorter proximal apical dendrites extend outward and below. Shape of majority of 2d section is approximately a cylinder with a pointed base for the apical arbor. The apical dendrites and basal dendrites possess a radial organization pattern as they extend from the soma. Proximal apical dendrites and basal dendrites have approximately the same density. Apical dendrites possess a larger average total dendritic length (6332 vs 5062 micrometres) and surface area (12629 vs 9404 square micrometres; neither includes spines). However, the number of terminal branches for both apical and basal dendrites appear to be similar. Distances between successive branch points are shorter for basal dendrites. The basal dendrite however has approximately 3 fold fewer endings per primary dendrite. This and the lower maximum branch order suggest lower complexity than apical dendritic trees. Basal dendrites have a shorter distance to the tips and a more restricted range than apical dendrites. Data suggests that proximal apical and basal dendrites are more compressed but offer a wider local range of activity than distal apical dendrites.

In CA3 neurons the inputs are stratified and run in bands parallel to the cell body layer. Dendritic attenuation of synaptic current is described by an exponential relationship. The closer to the body the dendrite, the higher the EPSP amplitude. Electrical measurements and predictions validate the cylinder cross-section model. In the CA3, the temporoammonic (TA), commissural (COM), associational (ASSOC), and mossy fiber (MF) afferents all make excitatory glutamatergic (Glu) synapses on pyramidal cell dendrites (both apical and basal).

Since fast signals occurring in the basilar and proximal apical dendrites are transferred to the soma with at least a 20–25% efficiency, synapses in these dendrites each contribute more to the neuronal activation than distal apical synapses. In contrast, only slow signals from the distal dendrites are efficiently transferred to the soma, suggesting a modulatory role on the resting potential of the cell. It is hypothesized in several studies that this could be accomplished by varying the overall frequency of synaptic activity in the distal apical dendrite. Since a constant barrage of synaptic activity would approximate a constant current injection, the overall level of synaptic activity in the distal apical dendrite could set the depolarization level of the entire neuron. When a more efficient proximal synaptic activity is superimposed upon a sub-threshold depolarization due to distal activity, the cell has a high probability of firing an AP. In CA3, it is the perforant path projection from the entorhinal cortical cells that provides synaptic input to the most distal dendrites of the pyramidal cells. Assuming a frequency average of 7 spikes/sec, as few as five randomly firing entorhinal cortical cells would cause a steady level of depolarization in the distal dendrites of CA3b pyramidal cells. Amplitude and kinetics of the electrical signal vary as a function of position within the dendrite and signal frequency.

The major trigger for CA3 discharge is the afferent input from the dentate gyrus granule cells, from which mossy fiber terminals create very complex synapses on the proximal part of the CA3 apical dendrite in the stratum lucidum. Here they contact very complex dendritic spines. Glutamate release from single terminals evokes a large non-NMDA mediated EPSP. The most proximal regions of CA3 pyramidal dendrites receive mossy fiber input exclusively, mid-dendritic regions (strata radiatum on the apical side and the oriens on the basal side) receive principally associational and Commissural fibers (from other CA3 cells), and the distal apical dendrites (stratum lacunosum-moleculare) receive input from the temporoammonic afferents (from the entorhinal cortex). Mossy fiber input to CA3 exhibits different plasticity than that of typical long term potentiation because it is dependent on (or at least sensitive to) monoaminergic (see monoamine) activation of the cAMP 2nd messenger system.

==== Interneurons in CA3 ====
These are similar to dentate cells. Interneuron cell types show unique dendritic arborization patterns and region specific targeting by axon collaterals. Investigators have shown that different morphologically defined interneurons show different electrical properties. These include both fast-spiking cells whose inhibitory post-synaptic potentials (IPSPs) sum to create small, smooth IPSPs in pyramidal cells and slow spiking cells (these produce large, fast-rising IPSPs in the pyramidal cell target). The dendritic region of CA3 is laminated.

For the input to the hippocampus proper, the temporoammonic pathway arises in layer III cells of the entorhinal cortex but separates from the perforant pathway to contact the most distal branches of the pyramidal cells in the stratum lacunosum-moleculare of CA1-CA3. The excitatory (glutaminergic) influence of this path has been questioned because influence on the pyramidal cells has been difficult to demonstrate. Recent experiments show that this modulation of pyramidal cells may differentially activate an interneuron subpopulation located in the distal reaches of the apical dendrites.

The study of inhibitory transmission is limited in the pyramidal neurons and their modulators because the large number of excitatory synapses has overshadowed physiological studies of the inhibitory neurons. The structure of inhibitory synapses on apical dendrites may not be as plastic as the excitatory synapses on these neurons. There is difficulty in differentiating the excitatory and inhibitory synapses using the electrophysiological recordings in many experiments. The excitatory synapses and their patterns are by comparison to the inhibitory system rather uniform in type and properties. The inhibitory system, by contrast, possess several (10) different types of synapses originating from specifically differentiated cells and are much more difficult to track. There is insufficient information to precisely distinguish between excitatory and inhibitory pathways contributing to the alterations in neurotransmitter expression and cell structure changes.

==== CA1 ====
CA1 pyramidal cells make up a homogeneous population which together with relatives in subiculum comprise the primary output cells of the hippocampal formation. Primary excitatory inputs are via glutamatergic CA3 Schaffer collaterals (both ipsi- and contralateral), which contact dendritic spines on the apical and basal dendrites in strata radiatum and oriens. Additional excitatory input is via the temporoammonic system which synapses on distal apical dendrites in the stratum lacunosum-moleculare.

Imaging studies following localized changes intracellular calcium from discrete synaptic inputs have shown a role for these currents in synaptic plasticity. There is disagreement, however, as to how activity-dependent changes in synaptic inhibition might occur. Studies do agree that plasticity is enhanced when inhibition is reduced.

==== CA2 ====
CA2 differs from other regions because it is one of the few areas to survive Temporal Lobe Epilepsy. Kainic acid, used to model TLE and related scleroses, affects primarily the mossy fiber synapses in CA3. It is thought that at these release glutamate with administration of KA. CA2 and CA3 can be distinguished using histological stains because the proximal apical dendrites of CA2 do not possess dendritic spines.

=== Entorhinal cortex ===
The entorhinal cortex (EC) is composed of six layers. Superficial layer I consists largely of afferent fibers onto the apical dendrites of the cells in layers II-VI. Caudal levels project strongly to rostral levels. Within each EC area, deeper layers innervate superficial layers, with superficial layers innervating adjacent superficial layers. Entorhinal pyramidal cells of layer V receive strong input from the perirhinal cortex and sensory cortices. These pyramidal cells then project into the superficial entorhinal layer II and III cells. Layer V EC cells have strong recurrent excitatory synapses much like CA3 layers in the hippocampus and when provoked are capable of burst activity. Medial to lateral entorhinal area connections are sparse and principally project from the medial EC to the lateral EC. These connections are not reciprocal. The majority of cells in the EC are pyramidal. More than 90% of layer V cells are regular spiking, with only a few burst-firing and fast-spiking cells. GABA is strong in superficial layers. Horizontal slice tissue preparations of both EC and hippocampus tissues show that exposure to low magnesium ion concentrations produces protracted seizure events. This response is likely a result of the interconnections of layer V pyramidal cells. Increases in extracellular potassium in seizures are seen in deeper layers. These responses are accurate reflections of in-vivo animal models.

=== Piriform cortex ===
In the piriform cortex, layer I consists mostly of afferent inputs to apical dendrites of deeper cells. Layer I is subdivided into layers Ia and Ib each having its own afferents. Layer II is densely packed with pyramidal and semilunar cells. Layer III contains mostly pyramidal cells in its superficial part.

In the piriform cortex the distal apical dendrites of layer III pyramidal neurons receive extrinsic inputs, which the corresponding proximal dendrites receive intrinsic inputs.

=== Olfactory bulb ===
In each glomerulus the axons of the receptor neurons contact the apical dendrites of mitral cells, which are the principal projection neurons in the olfactory bulb. Cell bodies of mitral cells are located in a distinct layer deep in the olfactory glomeruli. Each mitral cell extends a primary dendrite to a single glomerulus, where the dendrite gives rise to an elaborate tuft of branches onto which the primary olfactory axons synapse. Each glomerulus in the mouse model, for example, contains approximately 25 mitral cells which receive innervation from approximately 25,000 olfactory receptor axons. The convergence increases the sensitivity of mitral cells to odor detection.

=== Cerebral cortex ===
==== General ====
The most superficial layer of the cortex is the molecular or plexiform layer. It has a dense network of tangentially oriented fibers and cells made of axons of martinotti cells and stellate cells, as well as apical dendrites of pyramidal cells. Apical dendrites from pyramidal cells in the external granular layer and more prominently the external pyramidal layer project into the molecular layer. There are also in the plexiform layer GABAergic synaptic connections between the apical dendrites of granular cells and the basal dendrites of the tufted cells and mitral cells.

Some of the apical dendrites from the pyramidal cells in the cerebral cortex may be up to 10μm in diameter. The apical dendrite of a large pyramidal neuron in the cerebral cortex may contain thousands of spines. Spines in the cerebral cortex vary in size by several orders of magnitude from one region to another. Smallest have a length of 0.2μm and a volume of about 0.04 cubic micrometres and the largest a length of 6.5μm and a volume of 2 cubic micrometres.

==== Neocortex ====
Pyramidal cells are the majority class of cells in the neocortex. They have high density of dendritic spines, prominent apical dendrites, and axons that project out of the cortex as well as locally within it. Soma for these appear in all layers except I. Spiny stellate cells are distinguished from pyramidal cells here by the absence of the apical dendrite and the fact that their axons also do not leave the cortex. These cells are thought to begin as pyramidal neurons and then retract their apical dendrites and axons.

=== Cerebellum ===
A defining characteristic of Purkinje cells in the cerebellum is the apical dendrite.

== Development ==
Dendritic arbor formation for pyramidal neurons in the cortices occurs progressively beginning in late embryonic stages of development and extending well into post-natal periods. Many dendrites of pyramidal neurons in deep layers branch and form connections in layer IV, while some extend to more superficial layers. Pyramidal cell dendrites in layer III branch to form arbors in layer I. Thalamocortical afferents will make synaptic contact with dendrites in layer IV while myriad of other inputs will meet dendrites in layer I. The post-synaptic structure is driven in part by signals from incoming afferent fibers and through life there is plasticity in the synapses.

The formation of these arbors is regulated by the strength of local signals during development. Several patterns in activity control the development of the brain. Action potential changes in the retina, hippocampus, cortex, and spinal cord provide activity-based signals both to the active neurons and their post-synaptic target cells. Spontaneous activity originating within neuronal gap junctions, the cortex sub-plate, and sensory inputs are all involved in the cell signaling that regulates dendrite growth.

Useful models of dendritic arbor formation are the Xenopus tadpoles, which are transparent in early stages of larval development and allow for dye-labeled neurons to be repeatedly imaged in the intact animal over several weeks. It has been observed from this and other models that there are rapid dendritic branch additions and retractions which lengthen the overall dendrite and accumulate more branches. This mirrors the development of axonal branches (both have a lifetime of approximately 10min). This activity decreases as neurons mature. Signals including glutamate from axon branches may increase branch additions.

Within the Xenopus tadpole model, several signaling systems have been studied. For example, in optical tectal neurons, dendrite arbor growth occurs approximately at the onset of retinal input. Many on the caudal tectate have “silent” synapses which are modulated only by N-methyl-D-aspartate (NMDA) receptors. As neurons mature, alpha-amino-3-hydroxy-5-methyl-4-isoxazole (AMPA) receptors are added, increasing synaptic transmission. Neuron and dendrite development are NMDA dependent. Rapidly growing dendrite arbors are more dynamic than slowly growing ones and dendrites themselves play an active role in their own development. It has been shown in studies that transport of HCN (hyperpolarization activated cyclic nucleotide) gated channel isoforms to dendritic fields of CA1 pyramidal neurons in the hippocampus occurs in an age-specific manner in the developing hippocampus.

Among the signals studied in this system is CaMKII a calcium/calmodulin-regulated serine/threonine kinase which is required for induction by not expression of long-term potentiation. CaMKII mRNA is targeted to dendrites and both protein synthesis and enzyme activity are increased by strong synaptic input. Expression in Xenopus indicates that it is associated with the transition to slowed arbor growth. This suggests that activity promotes the reduction of dendrite branch growth and retraction, stabilizing the arbor configuration. The following pattern emerges for this system:

1. Branches with NMDA-only receptors mature and recruit AMPARs, which stabilize the branches.
2. These stable branches then add new branches with NMDAR-only synapses which either stabilize through AMPARs or retract. AMPAR additions are present in adults and account for synaptic plasticity.
3. CaMKII strengthening of signals results from the selective trafficking of GluR1 AMPARs into synapses. In long term depression (LTD) the GluR subunits of AMPARs undergo endocytosis.

Temporal differences in signaling over the course of neuron maturation suggest that the most promising studies of arbor development and synaptogenesis in the future are going to occur in intact brain systems.

Another model studied in apical dendrite development is the rat. Injection of tetanus toxin into neonatal rats has shown that growth of apical dendrites occurs normally during signal deprivation while basal dendrite growth is restricted. This indicates that neural activity is critical to new dendrite formation.

However, animal models may be insufficient to elucidate the complexity of these systems. Pyramidal cells in CA1, for example, are 30 times as thick in humans as they are in rats. The entorhinal cortex is also subdivided into as few as 8 and as many as 27 sections in humans (depending on the system used), whereas there are only 2 in rats and 7 in monkeys. The connections of the dentate gyrus and entorhinal cortex are also more sophisticated in humans. In rats and cats, a very large reciprocal connection exists between the entorhinal cortex and the olfactory system. In primates this connection is absent and there are highly differentiated connections between the multimodal parasensory and paralimbic cortices and the EC which are not as evident in rats and cats. The increased size of the primate subiculum may proportionally enhance its effects on the entorhinal cortex.

== Sexual dimorphism ==
Pyramidal cell dendritic arbor formation in the anterior cingulate cortex (layers 2/3) is more complex in males and, in contrast the orbital prefrontal regions, dendritic arborization is greater in females suggesting a fundamental difference in the prefrontal organization in males and females. In rats, for example, exposure to estrogen either exogenously or endogenously during proestrous leads to increases in CA1 spine densities. These differences may be due to the presence of gonadal hormones which have been demonstrated to influence cell structure in the hippocampus. Treatment with testosterone has been shown to affect cortical neuron structure.

== Pathology ==
=== Stress response and PTSD ===
Dendritic spines, post-synaptic structures receiving mainly excitatory input, are sensitive to experiences in development including stress episodes or drugs. Studies have shown that prenatal stress reduces complexity, length, and spine frequency of layer II/III pyramidal apical dendrites in rat and primate models. Dendritic atrophy has been described in hippocampal formation and prefrontal cortex in both models.

Chronic stress has been shown to reduce the arbor complexity and total dendritic length of apical dendrite trees of CA3 pyramidal neurons in the hippocampus as well. Chronic stress-induced changes in behavior have usually been attributed to changes in the hippocampus which is a primary neural target of glucocorticoids and is involved in many of the behaviors altered by corticosteroid administration. Both chronic stress and corticosteroid administration result in extensive atrophy of apical dendrites of pyramidal neurons in hippocampal area CA3, and these dendrites do not atrophy when cyanoketone (a corticosteroid blocker) is given. This dendrite atrophy is mediated by both glutaminergic and serotonergic systems (administration of either NMDA receptor antagonist CGP 43487 or serotonin uptake inhibitor tianeptine prevents atrophy). Cell death has been reported to prolonged treatment. Stress hormones in small doses do not themselves cause damage but magnify effects of other dangerous agents, including excitotoxins, hypoglycemia, hypoxia and ischemia. Damaging effects of stress in these neurons are thought to be related to expression of brain-derived neurotrophic factor (BDNF), the expression of which is reduced in stressed conditions and increased with the administration of anti-depressants.

The prefrontal cortex is also a target for the glucocorticoids in stress ([3H]dexamethasone binds to receptors in frontal and prefrontal cortex at about 75% of concentration of hippocampus). Endogenous regulation of corticosteroid receptors is indicated by altered binding of the previously mentioned compound in the prefrontal cortex with administration of corticosteroids. Furthermore, regulation of stress activities involves the prefrontal cortex. Lesions in rat prefrontal cortices impair spontaneous alternation, radial maze performance, and passive avoidance. In primates these impair inhibition of line-of-sight responses. Chronic administration of corticosteroids decreases 5-HT1A receptor binding, 5-HT2 receptor binding, serotonin levels, and expression of neural cell adhesion molecule (a cell-surface macromolecule involved in regulating aspects of synapse stabilization). These changes indicate structural change follows stress hormone elevation.

Studies of dendritic morphological changes indicate that elevation of stress hormones in layer II-III of the prefrontal cortex causes no observable change in the structure or distribution of basal dendrites. The apical dendrites, however, show a significant redistribution in stress-hormone treated animal brains, which is measured using Scholl analysis. Scholl analysis estimates the amount and distributions of dendrite material by counting numbers of intersections of dendrites with an overlay of concentric rings centered at the soma. Medial prefrontal cortex layer II-III pyramidal neurons showed significant reorganization with a 21% increase in proximal apical dendrite arbors and a decrease of 58% in distal apical dendrite arbors. These results are in contrast to the changes in the hippocampal CA3 dendritic arbors, in which only regressive changes were observed. One possible explanation proposed in these studies is that the atrophy of distal dendrites in II-III layer pyramidal neurons results directly from the loss of input from changed CA3 pyramidal neurons, as both CA1 and CA3 project directly into the medial prefrontal cortex.

It has been determined from electrophysiological data that excitatory synapses on proximal apical dendrites of prefrontal cortex pyramidal neurons serve to amplify excitatory post-synaptic potential (EPSP) signals generated in distal apical dendrites. This suggests that reduction in distal dendrite mass due to the stress hormone elevation may result in an increase in proximal apical dendrite complexity as the proximal apical dendrites attempt to offset the reduced distal apical dendrite signals.

Serotonergic alterations and alterations in glutamate release in the prefrontal cortex indicate that the neurochemical mechanisms altering structure in both the hippocampus and prefrontal cortex are similar.

The division of management between extrinsic and intrinsic inputs to the dendrites in the piriform cortex (mentioned above) is also seen to a lesser degree in the medial prefrontal cortex. This indicates that stress-induced changes to apical dendrites increase the relative emphasis of intra-cortical signals at the expense of extra-cortical signals.

In studies of hierarchical animals, it was observed that the dominant and subordinate animals show the same degree of dendritic reorganization, indicating that the dendritic atrophy with stress is not degree-dependent.

=== Metabolic disease ===
In neurometabolic diseases, distended storage neurons are markedly swollen and pear shaped, with the nucleus and the nissl bodies displaced toward the apical dendrites. Examples of neuron metabolic storage diseases are the sphingolipid storage diseases which typically involve malfunctioning hydrolases in the lysosomes responsible for the degradation of these lipids:

1. type 2 and type 3 Gaucher disease
2. GM1 gangliosidosis and GM2 gangliosidosis

This swelling is shown, for instance, in Tay–Sachs disease, a GM2 accumulation due to defective beta-hexosaminidase. Visible in this disorder are large mega-neurite formations.

=== Epilepsy ===
==== Cellular mechanisms ====
It has been indicated that there is a "chicken and egg" issue in the study of models relating to epilepsy because on the one hand the models are used to study the genesis of epilepsy and on the other they are used to study changes in prolonged events. The question arises, therefore, of whether the resulting data of the models indicated an exaggerated defect responsible for the genesis of seizures or whether the data indicated systemic changes to normal tissue after prolonged seizure activity.

Calcium currents, normally prominent in CA1 hippocampal neurons are increased in response to status epilepticus. There is evidence that current in T-type calcium channels is increased specifically in apical dendrites. The hypothesis is that this phenomenon creates a situation in which fast sodium spikes in the soma back-propagate into the dendrites, whereby they detonate bursting.

Dendritic potentials (DPs) also undergo changes. Elicitation of DPs during seizure activity showed that they were much smaller than controls. However, DPs elicited just after seizure termination lasted for longer periods, indicating that suppression of the DP is correlated with the seizure activity itself.

Glutamate is an excitatory neurotransmitter capable of causing a metabolic injury to neurons. In the hippocampus, GABAergic neurons have been found vulnerable to excitotoxic action of glutamate at the kainate receptor. These receptors are most dense in sectors CA3 and CA2 of the hippocampus, where nanomolar (nM) concentrations of kainic acid have been associated with pronounced and persistent depolarization of CA3 pyramidal neurons. This involving the conduction of excitatory activity along the mossy fiber projections from the area dentate granule cells to the CA3 neurons. Stimulation of this receptor type has been associated with paroxysmal spikes similar to seizures.

Plasticity in CA1 pyramidal cells and interneurons has been related to CA1 roles in epileptogenesis. CA1 is hyperexcitable when the CA3 region is damaged. Reduction of both GABAA and GABAB IPSPs occurs. GABA interneurons, though intact, become less easily activated.

Seizure input from the EC to the dentate gyrus is filtered for both ictal and normal activity patterns, while CA3 cells impose an inter-ictal profile, reinforcing abnormal activity.

Hyperventilation leads to a marked surface negative direct current shift due to depolarization of the apical dendritic trees of the cortical pyramidal cells. This shift is likely to represent the increased excitability of the cortical neuronal networks and may explain the resultant potential epileptogenicity. Certain anti-epileptic drugs have the opposing effect of reducing surface negativity in normal controls.

==== Temporal lobe epilepsy ====
Changes in expression of potassium channels and of potassium currents have been described in a model of temporal lobe epilepsy. In this model, there is downregulation of the A-type encoding Kv4.2 channel. This channel is involved in limiting backpropagation of action potentials and in reducing the transfer of excitatory postsynaptic potentials (EPSPs) from apical dendrites into the soma. In the same model, the aforementioned upregulation of t-type calcium channels also has been shown to result in increased burst behavior in neurons in the hippocampus.

==== Infantile seizures and associated memory impairment ====
Neuronal death does not appear to contribute to the learning deficits in rats with infant seizures. CA3 neurons in the tetanus toxin model of early onset epilepsy, however, show a reduction in the branching complexity of basal dendrites as well as a decrease in the spine density on both the apical dendrites and the basal dendrites. Similar data have been taken from epileptic human patients during surgical procedures. In neocortical and hippocampal foci, a decrease in length and branching complexity of dendritic arbors and a reduction in the branching complexity of the remaining dendrites were observed. The chronic alumina cream model of epilepsy in primates has produced similar data. Because dendrites and their spines are sites of excitatory synaptic input onto neurons, the results suggest that the glutaminergic synaptic transmission may be reduced. As these are sites active in long-term potentiation (LTP) and other alterations in synaptic transmission that underlie learning and memory, changes at these sites could explain learning and memory deficits associated with both early-onset and long-term epilepsy.

=== Schizophrenia ===
In individuals with schizophrenia, post-mortem analysis has indicated a decrease of GABAergic cells and activity in the hippocampus.

=== Human neocortical heterotopia ===
Heterotopia is the displacement of any organ or component thereof from its natural position. Rat models of telencephalic internal structural heterotopia are used as a model for human neocortical heterotopia. In these models, the apical dendrites of the pyramidal neurons are not consistently radially oriented and may even be inverted. Additionally, the dendrites near the edge of the heterotopic region often bend and follow the contour of the band.

== Methods of studying effects ==
The following list is adapted from Lothman, et al.

=== In-vivo imaging ===
1. Magnetic resonance imaging (MRI)
2. Computerized tomography (CT)
3. Positron emission tomography (PET)
4. Film autoradiography
5. Single photon emission computerized tomography (SPECT)
6. Surface, subdural, and depth electroencephalography
7. Magnetoencephalography
8. Evoked potentials
9. Focal electrical stimulation
10. Afterdischarges
11. Physiological, psychological responses to stimulation
12. Single unit recording

=== In-vitro physiology ===
1. Slices
2. In-vitro imaging: standard light and electron microscopy
3. Histochemistry
4. Immunocytochemistry
5. Receptor autoradiography
6. Lesions
  1. Destructive
  2. Reversible
  3. Cryolesions
7. Pharmacological

=== Seizure changes ===
Two methods are studying the relationship between seizures and dendritic impairment:

1. Seizures activate stress mechanisms including the excitatory neuropeptide corticotropin-releasing hormone (CRH) from hippocampal neurons. CRH has been shown to interfere with dendritic growth and differentiation. Mice lacking this receptor possess exuberant dendritic trees. However, pyramidal cells exposed to CRH during the first week of life had atrophied dendrites. These stress-related changes reduced synaptic plasticity and caused learning and memory deficits later in life. As antagonists for CRH exist, there exists a potential to reverse or prevent these effects through pharmacological means.
2. Studies of recurrent febrile seizures have shown that seizures resulted in impaired learning and memory but also disrupted signaling that normally results in activation of cAMP response element binding factor (CREB), a transcription factor. For rats tested in the inhibitory avoidance learning paradigm, normally an activation of CREB occurs by phosphorylation at Ser133. This activation is impaired following recurrent febrile seizures. A seizure-induced modification of a signaling cascade upstream of CREB is suggested by this. Adult rats with infant febrile seizures were treated with Rolipram, a specific phosphodiesterase type IV inhibitor (PDE4 inhibitor), which resultes in the activation of protein kinase A (PKA) and is known to activate CREB by the mitogen-activated protein kinase (MAPK) pathway. Rolipram treatment reversed the learning deficits in rats that had experienced recurrent febrile seizures.

=== Optical monitoring ===
Recording the activity of a single neuron at any given time at many locations in the dendritic tree has been accomplished using voltage-sensitive dyes with optical monitoring. Signals are rapid but also small, and measurements from single cells require intense illumination. As the dyes are very phototoxic, the cells usually die after only a few action potentials. However, measurements from both somatic and dendritic patch recordings show that the peak membrane potential deflection during a paroxysmal depolarizing shift (PDS) is 10mV greater in the apical trunk (supragranular location) than the soma. This is consistent with the anatomy of neocortical networks because the most powerful reciprocal layer connections are in supragranular layers 2 and 3. This may resolve the conflicting information suggesting that the activity spreads primarily at the supragranular layers or at the large layer 5 neurons.

Conventional studies with electron microscopy or Golgi stains portrayed dendrites as stable structures. However, time-lapsed photography and two-photon microscopy have revealed dendrites as living, constantly changing tissues which are motile on a rapid time scale.

=== Electroencephalogram ===
Electroencephalogram (EEG) scalp signals are summed EPSPs and IPSPs of nerve cells. EEG can only measure the potentials of cells arranged in organized layers and whose apical dendrites are oriented perpendicularly to the surface of the cortex (as they are in pyramidal cells). The potential measured by the EEG is the difference between the basal and apical parts of the active neurons that are oriented in such a way. The EPSPs that converge on the pyramidal neurons through direct afferent fibers ending in the upper part of the apical dendrites cause a flow of charged ions (a current) between points at different potentials within and outside neurons. The positive ions then enter the cell following concentration and electrical charge gradient and propagate to the rest of the neuron. EPSPs from the distal apical dendrites create a current starting from the apical part nearest to the synapse (where the magnitude is greater) toward the cell body because the resistance to this flow is less. The current perpendicular (or radial) to the apical dendrite is accompanied by a magnetic field that propagates orthogonally (or tangentially) to the current along the extracellular side of the cell membrane. This set of ionic and electrical functional alterations thus generates the fields of electromagnetic potentials or electromagnetic dipoles. These can be defined also as single equivalent dipoles.
