= Multipolar neuron =

Cell type with a single axon and many dendrites

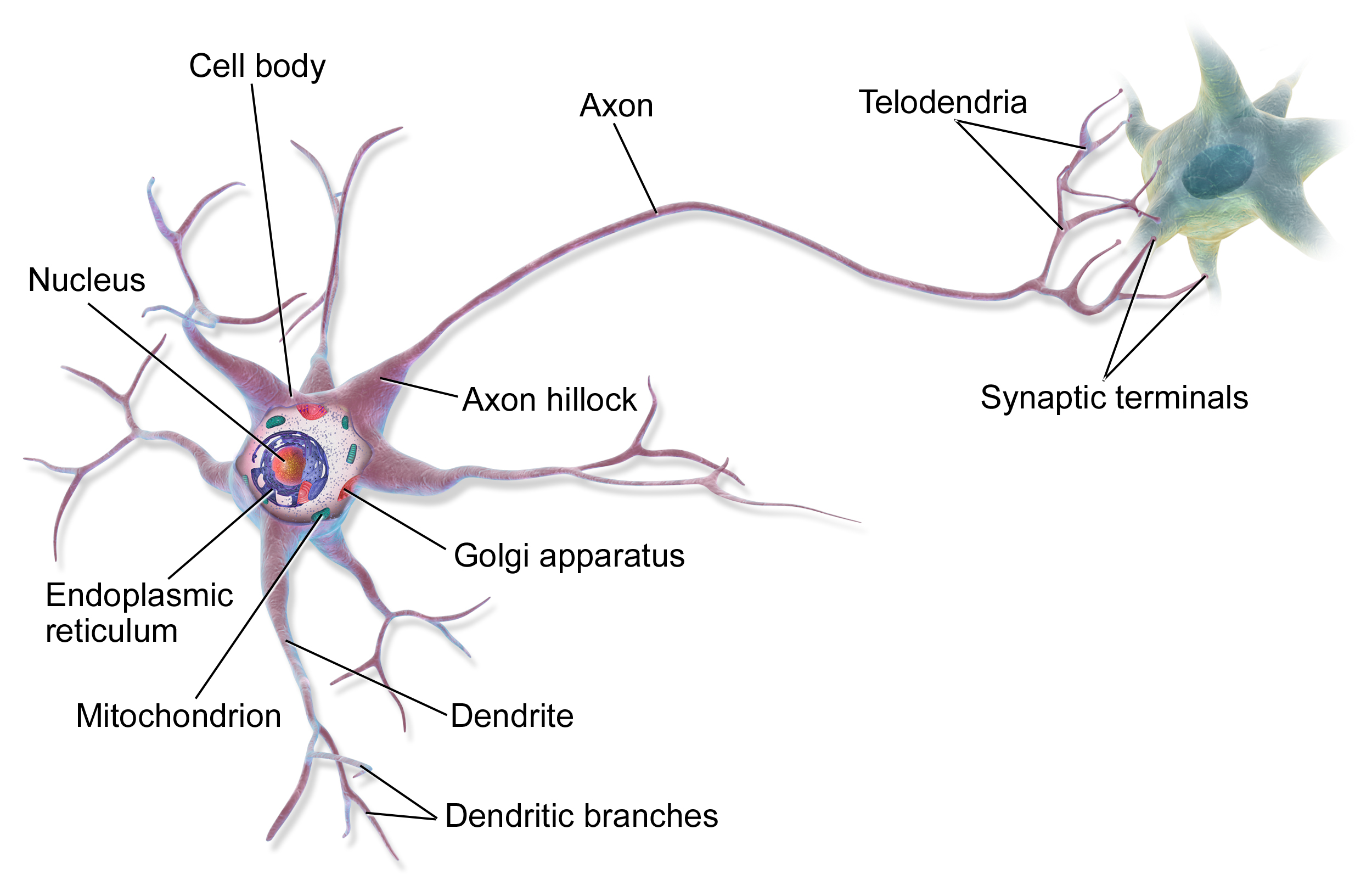
- Anatomy of multipolar neuron

Identifiers
- FMA: 67287

A multipolar neuron is a type of neuron that possesses a single axon and many dendrites (and dendritic branches), allowing for the integration of a great deal of information from other neurons. These processes are projections from the neuron cell body. Multipolar neurons constitute the majority of neurons in the central nervous system. They include motor neurons, and also interneurons (relay neurons), which are most commonly found in the cortex of the brain and the spinal cord. Peripherally, multipolar neurons are found in autonomic ganglia.

== See also ==
- Dogiel cells
- Ganglion cell
- Purkinje cell
- Pyramidal cell

== Additional images ==
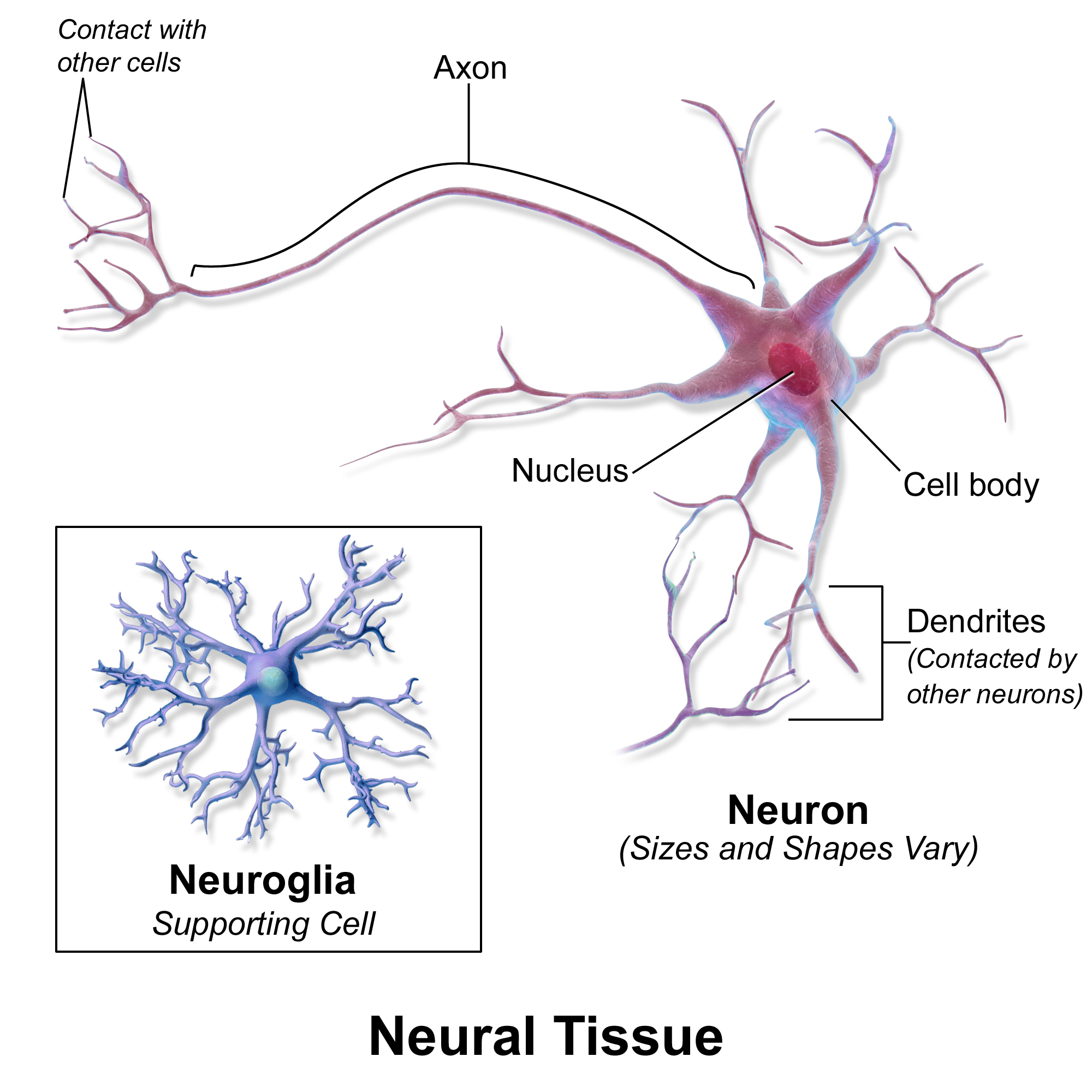
Neural tissue

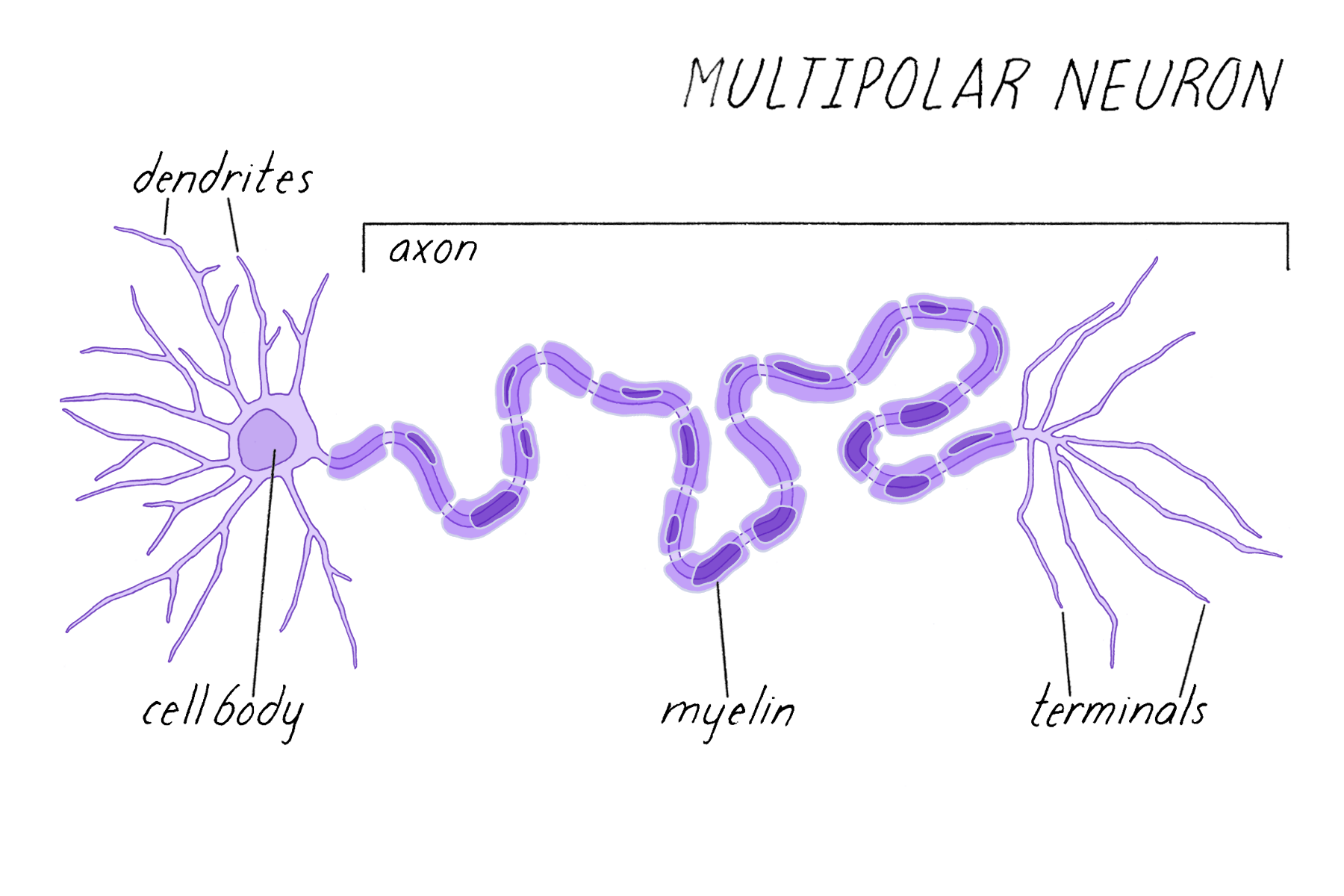
A neuron composed of a cell body with multiple dendrites and one axon extending from the cell body.
