= Synaptotropic hypothesis =

Neurobiological theory

The synaptotropic hypothesis, also called the synaptotrophic hypothesis, is a neurobiological hypothesis of neuronal growth and synapse formation. The hypothesis was first formulated by J.E. Vaughn in 1988, and remains a focus of current research efforts. The synaptotropic hypothesis proposes that input from a presynaptic to a postsynaptic cell (and maturation of excitatory synaptic inputs) eventually can change the course of synapse formation at dendritic and axonal arbors. This synapse formation is required for the development of neuronal structure in the functioning brain.

== Dendritic Arbor Development ==
=== Growth ===
Dendrites of central nervous system neurons grow by addition and retraction of thin branches. This process is highly dynamic. Only a small fraction of newly added branches are actually maintained to become long-lasting components of the arbor. This process suggests that the branches sample the environment to detect the appropriate cells with which to form synapses. As a result, the hypothesis predicts that growth will be directed into regions containing more presynaptic elements. This morphology can be stabilized by creating microtubule nucleation at the microtubules.

=== Synaptogenesis ===
The formation of new synapses begins with initial contact between cells via cell-cell adhesion. This contact often occurs between either axonal or dendritic filopodia, which are highly dynamic and rarely stabilize. Next, the adhesive contact is converted to a nascent synapse, which contains glutamatergic NMDA receptors, but not AMPA receptors. However, the activation of NMDARs by glutamate can trigger the recruitment of AMPARs from the postsynaptic density. They also have a relatively high concentration of dense-core vesicles, which are thought to deliver structural proteins to the presynaptic site.

=== Synapse Maturation ===
Maturation of glutamatergic synapses involves changes in the amplitude of AMPA receptor-mediated synaptic transmission, as well as in the NMDAR subunit composition. Further, it includes the assembly of the postsynaptic density, which is a protein-dense region with both structural and signaling functions. Synaptic vesicles are also recruited, resulting in an increase in the reliability of synaptic transmission.

=== Neuronal Architecture ===
Although neurons generally follow a basic morphological pattern (consisting of the tree-like dendritic arbor, a cell body, and an axonal output), the number of pre-and post-synaptic elements are unique to every neuron and are central to understanding their complex neural function.

The synaptotropic hypothesis implies that function drives form, since the appropriateness of new synapses is constantly being tested by the filopodia in the first stages of dendritogenesis, thus determining the form of the neural architecture.

== Modifications of the Hypothesis ==
Some interpret the synaptotropic hypothesis as saying that manipulations that increase synapse formation and maturation promote formation of larger dendritic arbors, while treatments that reduce synapse maturation result in smaller arbors. However, the opposite result has been found in different manipulations of the molecular pathways underlying synaptogeneis. A resulting modified version of the hypothesis has emerged “in which graded levels of synaptic maturation produce corresponding levels of stabilization”. This is a different way of viewing the synaptotropic hypothesis that still takes into account the molecular mechanisms of dendritogenesis and synaptogenesis.

== Supporting Evidence ==
The synaptotropic hypothesis would predict that cell adhesion molecules that are important in synapse formation would also greatly affect dendritic arbor growth. This has been shown to be the case with cadherins.

When peptides that mimic the cytoplasmic tails of AMPA receptors are expressed in individual Xenopus neurons, trafficking of AMPA receptors to nascent synapses is minimized in those cells. These cells, like normal neurons, extend and retract dendritic branches. In the normal cell, some of these branches would form synapses, which is not the case in the neurons expressing the peptide. As a result, these cells have minimal dendritic arbors. This is because without AMPA receptors, the neuron can't cause neighboring neurons to fire action potentials, therefore disallowing their synapses to strengthen.

As described previously, the pattern of dendritic branching depends on the initial contact of filopodia with afferent axons. The hypothesis predicts that regions with numerous prospective presynaptic terminals will attract more growing dendrites. Researchers have used the developing mouse spinal cord to test this hypothesis. A computer-assisted three-dimensional reconstruction system has been used with Golgi's method preparations of mouse spinal cords. The relative dendritic lengths and densities at various zones in the spinal cord indicate that dendritic growth is initially primarily towards the marginal zone (because of synaptogenic presynaptic terminals). However, this biased distribution is lost as synapses form in the intermediate zone. This study is consistent with predictions of the synaptotropic hypothesis of dendritic branching.

== Dissenting Evidence ==
Evidence against the synaptotropic hypothesis comes from experiments with “munc 18 knock-out mice”, mice engineered to be missing the Munc 18-1 protein, without which the mice never release neurotransmitters from synaptic vesicles. Despite this, the mice develop normal brains before dying immediately after birth.

== Imaging Techniques ==
=== Dynamic Morphometrics ===
Dynamic morphometrics technology involves new methods of labeling, imaging, and quantifying dendritogenesis. The transparent, externally developing vertebrate embryos of Xenopus laevis and zebrafish allow direct imaging of the organism in the critical stages of development while keeping the embryos intact. Individual brain neurons can be fluorescently labeled using single cell electroporation while leaving the rest of the brain unaltered. Also, two-photon microscopy allows in vivo time-lapse imaging to create high-resolution, 3D images of neurons deep within the living brain, again with minimal damage to the brain. New computer software also can now track and measure dendritic growth. These methods comprise a new type of imaging technology that can monitor the process of dendritogenesis and can help give evidence to either dissent with or support the synaptotropic hypothesis.

=== Applications ===
Dynamic morphometrics and other imaging techniques have been used to observe both dendrite growth and synaptogenesis—two processes between which the relationship is not well understood. Non-spiny dendritic arbors expressing a fluorescent postsynaptic marker protein were imaged as they arborized (in the zebrafish larvae), and this confirmed the role of newly extended dendritic filopodia in synaptogenesis, their maturation into dendritic branches, and the result, namely, growth and branching of the dendritic arbor. These findings support the model wherein synapse formation can direct dendrite arborization, a basic tenet of the synaptotropic hypothesis.
