= Dendrodendritic synapse =

Connections between dendrites

Dendrodendritic synapses are connections between the dendrites of two different neurons. This is in contrast to the more common axodendritic synapse (chemical synapse) where the axon sends signals and the dendrite receives them. Dendrodendritic synapses are activated in a similar fashion to axodendritic synapses in respects to using a chemical synapse. An incoming action potential permits the release of neurotransmitters to propagate the signal to the post synaptic cell. There is evidence that these synapses are bi-directional, in that either dendrite can signal at that synapse. Ordinarily, one of the dendrites will display inhibitory effects while the other will display excitatory effects. The actual signaling mechanism utilizes Na^{+} and Ca^{2+} pumps in a similar manner to those found in axodendritic synapses.

== History ==
In 1966 Wilfrid Rall, Gordon Shepherd, Thomas Reese, and Milton Brightman found a novel pathway, dendrites that signaled to dendrites. While studying the mammalian olfactory bulb, they found that there were active dendrites that couple and send signals to each other. The topic was then explored only sporadically due to difficulties with techniques and technology available to further investigate dendrodendritic synapses. Investigations into this phenomenon of active dendrites has resurfaced with vigor at the start the 21st century.

The study of dendrodendritic synapses in the olfactory bulb provided some early examples of ideas about neuronal organization relating to dendritic spines

- One spine could serve as an input-output unit
- One neuron could contain multiple dendritic spines
- These spines are widely spaced, indicating some independent function
- Synaptic input-output events can occur without axonal stimulation

== Location ==
Dendrodendritic synapses have been found and studied in both the olfactory bulb and the retina. They have also been found though not extensively studied in the following brain regions: thalamus, substantia nigra, locus ceruleus.

=== Olfactory bulb ===
Dendrodendritic synapses have been studied extensively in the olfactory bulb of rats where it is believed they help in the process of differentiating smells. The granule cells of the olfactory bulb communicate exclusively through dendrodendritic synapses because they lack axons. These granule cells form dendrodendritic synapses with mitral cells to convey odor information from the olfactory bulb. Lateral inhibition from the granule cell spines helps to contribute to contrasts between odors and in odor memory.

Dendrodendritic synapses have also been found to have similar effects on olfactory input from the glomeruli of the antennal lobe of insects.

=== Retina ===
The spatial and color contrast systems of the retina operate in a similar manner. Dendrodendritic homologous gap junctions have been found as a way of communication between dendrites in the retinal α-type Ganglion cells to produce a faster method of communication to modulate the color contrast system. Using bidirectional electrical synapses in the dendrodendritic synapses they modulate inhibition of different signals thus allowing for a modulation of the color contrast system. This dendritic function is an alternative modulatory system to that of pre-synaptic inhibition which is presumed to also help differentiate different contrast in the visual sense.

== Neuroplasticity ==
Dendrodendritic synapses can play a role in neuroplasticity. In a simulated disease state where axons were destroyed, some neurons formed dendrodendritic synapses to compensate. In experiments where deafferentation or axotomy was performed in the lateral geniculate nucleus (LGN) of cats it was found that pre-synaptic dendrites began to form to compensate for the lost axons. These pre-synaptic dendrites were revealed to form new dendrodendritic excitatory synapses in the cells that had survived. The development of presynaptic dendrites forming dendrodendritic synapses in the Cerebellar Cortex of mice has also been found following the differentiation of that region. This type of dendritic reactive synaptogenesis is thought to occur in order to re-saturate the region which has become vacant postsynaptic sites following neurodegeneration caused by deafferentation or axotomy in order to restore partial functionality to the affected region. Partial recovery within the LGN has been shown thus supporting the validity of dendrodendritic synapses between neighboring relay neurons functionality.
