= Soma (biology) =

Portion of a brain cell containing its nucleus

Soma

In cellular neuroscience, the soma (pl.: somata or somas; from Greek σῶμα (sôma) 'body'), or cell body, is the bulbous, non-process portion of a neuron or glial cell that contains the cell nucleus. The part of the soma without the nucleus is called the perikaryon (pl.: perikarya).

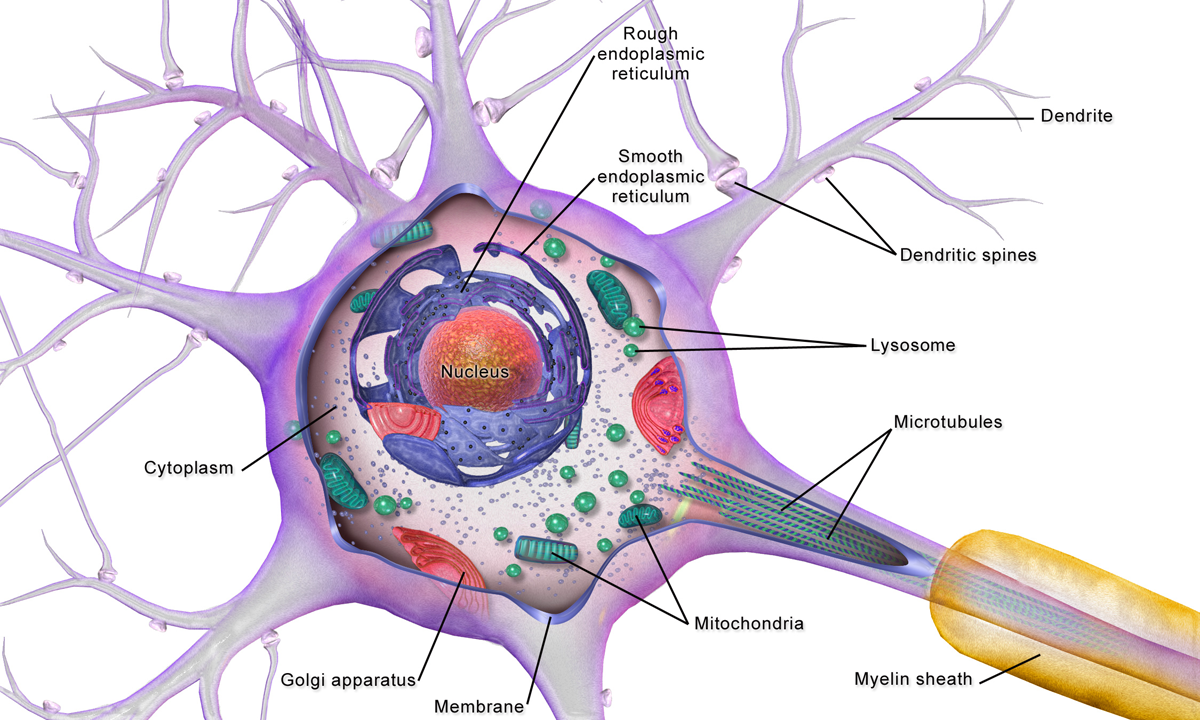
Cell body of a neuron containing the nucleus.

== Ultrastructure ==
The soma of a neuron (i.e., the main part of the neuron in which the dendrites branch off of) contains many organelles, including granules called Nissl granules, which are composed largely of rough endoplasmic reticulum and free polyribosomes. The cell nucleus is a key feature of the soma. The nucleus is the source of most of the RNA that is produced in neurons. In general, most proteins are produced from mRNAs that do not travel far from the cell nucleus. This creates a challenge for supplying new proteins to axon endings that can be a meter or more away from the soma.

=== Microtubules and neurofilaments ===
Axons contain microtubule-associated motor proteins that transport protein-containing vesicles between the soma and the synapses at the axon terminals. Such transport of molecules towards and away from the soma maintains critical cell functions. In case of neurons, the soma receives a large number of inhibitory synapses, which can regulate the activity of these cells. It has also been shown that microglial processes constantly monitor neuronal functions through somatic junctions, and exert neuroprotection when needed.

Intermediate filaments are abundant in both perikarya and axonal and dendritic processes and are called neurofilaments. The neurofilaments become cross-linked with certain fixatives and when impregnated with silver, they form neurofibrils visible with the light microscope.

=== Axon hillock ===
The axon hillock is a specialized domain of the neuronal cell body from which the axon originates. A high amount of protein synthesis occurs in this region, as it contains many Nissl granules (which are ribosomes wrapped in RER) and polyribosomes. Within the axon hillock, materials are sorted as either items that will enter the axon (like the components of the cytoskeletal architecture of the axon, mitochondria, etc.) or will remain in the soma. In addition, the axon hillock also has a specialized plasma membrane that contains large numbers of voltage-gated ion channels, since this is most often the site of action potential initiation and triggering.

== Survival factors ==
The survival of some sensory neurons depends on axon terminals making contact with sources of survival factors that prevent apoptosis. The survival factors are neurotrophic factors, including molecules such as nerve growth factor (NGF). NGF interacts with receptors at axon terminals, and this produces a signal that must be transported up the length of the axon to the nucleus. A 2004 theory of how such survival signals are sent from axon endings to the soma includes the idea that NGF receptors are endocytosed from the surface of axon tips and that such endocytotic vesicles are transported up the axon.
