= Speed cell =

Neurons whose firing rates depend on an animal's speed through its environment

Speed cells are neurons whose firing rates depend on an animal's speed through its environment. Together with place cells, grid cells, boundary cells, and head direction cells, they form a part of a larger set of neurons that are involved in cognitive mapping of the surrounding environment. Speed cells are found in the entorhinal cortex.

== Background ==
With the discovery of grid cells in 2005 by Edvard Moser and May Britt Moser, it was realized that the grid cells were not alone in deducing the spatial location of the animal. The grid cells used information about direction and the speed in order to find the location. The discovery of head direction by James B. Ranck, Jr. located the cells responsible for information on direction of head or heading of animal. The Mosers continued searching for the assumed speed cells and in 2015, were able to prove the presence of such cells in the medial entorhinal cortex.

The speed cells fire in response to variations in speed of the animal. It was also found that, unlike place cells, the speed cells are independent of visual cues. Darkness did not influence the firing rate of the animal. Another interesting feature of the cells is that the firing of the cells is better correlated with the future speed of the animal suggesting that the speed of the animal is known in advance by the speed cells.

== Experiment ==
In the experiment conducted by the Mosers', rats were made to run a constricted 4 meter long track. The module resembled a car from The Flintstones cartoon with no bottom. The rats were guided by this car to run at speed of 7, 14, 21 and 28 cm/s. The firing of the cells was recorded. The rat was awarded with chocolate at the end of the track. In order to eliminate the response of nearby entorhinal cells to the readings, a second experiment was conducted. In this the rats were allowed to forage freely with speed varying from 0 to 50 cm/s.

== Function ==
The speed cell firing in response to the movement of the animal provides instantaneous running speed to the grid cell. The grid cell in turn uses this information along with the head direction in order to calculate the location of the animal in the cognitive map.

The grid cell along with head direction cells, border cells, speed cells and place cells provide a correlation between different movement aspects of the animal with respect to its environment.

Alzheimer's disease involves damage to the entorhinal cortex. This area contains most of the cells involved in cognitive mapping and this could suggest why patients suffering from Alzheimer's disease tend to forget or become lost. Edvard Moser also suggests that understanding the working of the human GPS can provide cues to understanding other brain functions such as association of smell and memory.

== See also ==
List of distinct cell types in the adult human body
