= Path integration =

Means of dead reckoning used by animals

Path integration sums the vectors of distance and direction traveled from a start point to estimate current position, and so the path back to the start.

Path integration is the method thought to be used by animals for dead reckoning.

== History ==
Charles Darwin first postulated an inertially-based navigation system in animals in 1873. Studies beginning in the middle of the 20th century confirmed that animals could return directly to a starting point, such as a nest, in the absence of vision and having taken a circuitous outwards journey. This shows that they can use cues to track distance and direction in order to estimate their position, and hence how to get home. This process was named path integration to capture the concept of continuous integration of movement cues over the journey. Manipulation of inertial cues confirmed that at least one of these movement (or idiothetic) cues is information from the vestibular organs, which detect movement in the three dimensions. Other cues probably include proprioception (information from muscles and joints about limb position), motor efference (information from the motor system telling the rest of the brain what movements were commanded and executed), and optic flow (information from the visual system signaling how fast the visual world is moving past the eyes). Together, these sources of information can tell the animal which direction it is moving, at what speed, and for how long. In addition, sensitivity to the Earth's magnetic field for underground animals (e.g., mole rat) can give path integration.

== Mechanism ==
Studies in arthropods, most notably in the Sahara desert ant (Cataglyphis bicolor), reveal the existence of highly effective path integration mechanisms that depend on determination of directional heading (by polarized light or sun position) and distance computations (by monitoring leg movement or optical flow).

In mammals, three important discoveries shed light on this.

The first, in the early 1970s, is that neurons in the hippocampal formation, called place cells, respond to the position of the animal.

The second, in the early 1990s, is that neurons in neighboring regions (including anterior thalamus and post-subiculum), called head direction cells, respond to the head direction of the animal. This enables a much more fine-grained study of path integration since it is possible to manipulate movement information and see how place and head direction cells respond (a much simpler procedure than training an animal, which is very slow).

The third finding was that neurons in the dorso-medial entorhinal cortex, which feeds information to the place cells in the hippocampus, fire in a metrically regular way across the whole surface of a given environment. The activity patterns of these grid cells looks very much like a hexagonally organized sheet of graph paper, and suggest a possible metric system that place cells can use to compute distances. Whether place and grid cells actually compute a path integration signal remains to be seen, but computational models exist suggesting this is plausible. Certainly, brain damage to these regions seems to impair the ability of animals to path integrate.

David Redish states that "The carefully controlled experiments of Mittelstaedt and Mittelstaedt (1980) and Etienne (1987) have demonstrated conclusively that this ability [path integration in mammals] is a consequence of integrating internal cues from vestibular signals and motor efferent copy".

== See also ==
- Cognitive map
- Motion perception

== Bibliography ==
- Best PJ, White AM, Minai A (2001). "Spatial processing in the brain: the activity of hippocampal place cells". Annu Rev Neurosci. 24: 459–486. doi:10.1146/annurev.neuro.24.1.459. PMID 11283318.
- Etienne AS, Jeffery KJ (2004). "Path integration in mammals" (PDF). Hippocampus. 14 (2): 180–192. doi:10.1002/hipo.10173. PMID 15098724. S2CID 1646974. Archived from the original (PDF) on 2017-08-13.
- McNaughton BL, Battaglia FP, Jensen O, Moser EI, Moser MB (2006). "Path integration and the neural basis of the 'cognitive map'". Nat Rev Neurosci. 7 (8): 663–678. doi:10.1038/nrn1932. PMID 16858394. S2CID 16928213.
- Redish, A David (1999). Beyond the Cognitive Map. MIT Press. PDF
- Taube JS (1998). "Head direction cells and the neurophysiological basis for a sense of direction". Prog Neurobiol. 55 (3): 225–256. doi:10.1016/S0301-0082(98)00004-5. PMID 9643555. S2CID 38083940.
