= Postrhinal cortex =

Area of the brain implicated in memory

The postrhinal cortex is a cortical region of the brain located dorsal and caudal to the posterior rhinal sulcus and adjacent to the entorhinal cortex. It forms part of the parahippocampal region and has been implicated in memory processing and spatial navigation.

== See also ==
- Grid cells
- Place cells
