= Phase precession =

Neural mechanism

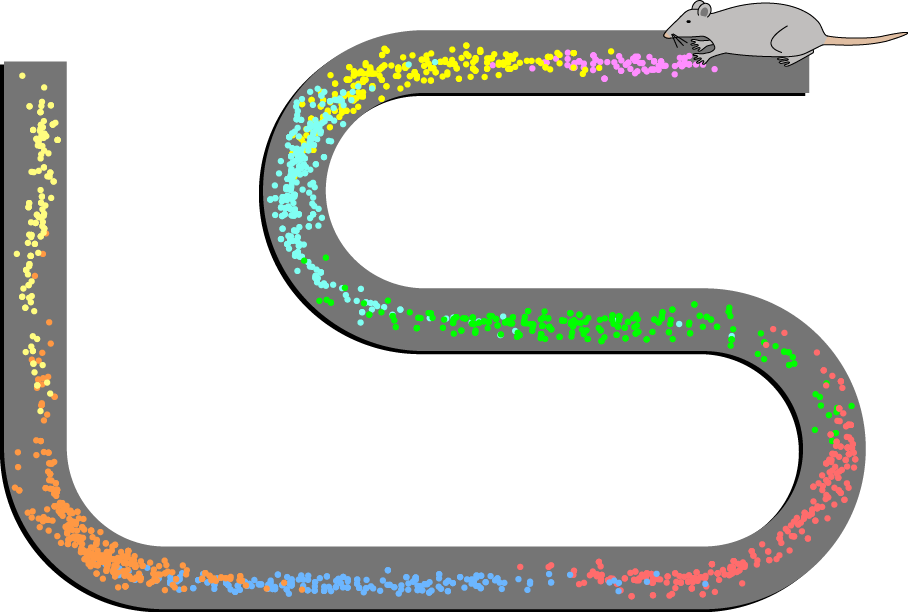
Spatial firing patterns of 8 place cells recorded from the hippocampal CA1 layer of a rat's brain. Dots indicate positions (place fields) where action potentials were recorded as the rat moved back and forth along a track, with color indicating which neuron emitted that action potential.

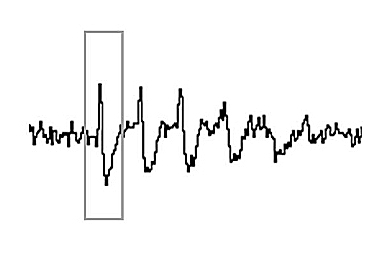
Action potentials (one in the box) recorded from a single place cell during a burst of activity

An EEG theta wave

Phase precession is a neurophysiological process in which the time of firing of action potentials by individual neurons occurs progressively earlier in relation to the phase of the local field potential oscillation with each successive cycle. In place cells, a type of neuron found in the hippocampal region of the brain, phase precession is believed to play a major role in the neural coding of information. John O'Keefe, who later shared the 2014 Nobel Prize in Physiology or Medicine for his discovery that place cells help form a "map" of the body's position in space, co-discovered phase precession with Michael Recce in 1993.

== Place cells ==
Pyramidal cells in the hippocampus called place cells play a significant role in self-location during movement over short distances. As a rat moves along a path, individual place cells fire action potentials at an increased rate at particular positions along the path, termed "place fields". Each place cell's maximum firing rate – with action potentials occurring in rapid bursts – occurs at the position encoded by that cell; and that cell fires only occasionally when the animal is at other locations. Within a relatively small path, the same cells are repeatedly activated as the animal returns to the same position.

Although simple rate coding (the coding of information based on whether neurons fire more rapidly or more slowly) resulting from these changes in firing rates may account for some of the neural coding of position, there is also a prominent role for the timing of the action potentials of a single place cell, relative to the firing of nearby cells in the local population. As the larger population of cells fire occasionally when the rat is outside of the cells' individual place fields, the firing patterns are organized to occur synchronously, forming wavelike voltage oscillations. These oscillations are measurable in local field potentials and electroencephalography (EEG). In the CA1 region of the hippocampus, where the place cells are located, these firing patterns give rise to theta waves. Theta oscillations have classically been described in rats, but evidence is emerging that they also occur in humans.

In 1993, O'Keefe and Recce discovered a relationship between the theta wave and the firing patterns of individual place cells. Although the occasional action potentials of cells when rats were outside of the place fields occurred in phase with (at the peaks of) the theta waves, the bursts of more rapid spikes elicited when the rats reached the place fields were out of synchrony with the oscillation. As a rat approached the place field, the corresponding place cell would fire slightly in advance of the theta wave peak. As the rat moved closer and closer, each successive action potential occurred earlier and earlier within the wave cycle. At the center of the place field, when the cell would fire at its maximal rate, the firing had been advanced sufficiently to be anti-phase to the theta potential (at the bottom, rather than at the peak, of the theta waveform). Then, as the rat continued to move on past the place field and the cell firing slowed, the action potentials continued to occur progressively earlier relative to the theta wave, until they again became synchronous with the wave, aligned now with one wave peak earlier than before. O'Keefe and Recce termed this advancement relative to the wave phase "phase precession". Subsequent studies showed that each time a rat entered a completely different area and the place fields would be remapped, place cells would again become phase-locked to the theta rhythm. It is now widely accepted that the anti-phase cell firing that results from phase precession is an important component of information coding about place.

== Other systems ==
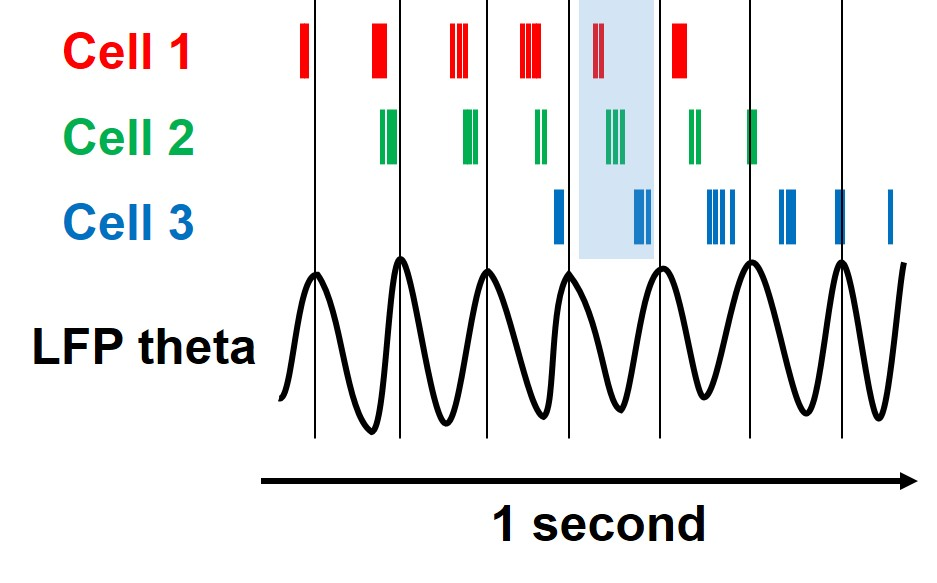
Schematic of phase precession in three place cells. A rat runs left-to-right and the firing of the cells (shown as colored tick marks) is spatially localized, with the three place fields (represented by the three colors) overlapping. The local field potential theta rhythm is shown at the bottom in black. The action potentials of each cell occur earlier and earlier with respect to the theta peak on each successive cycle – this is phase precession. One consequence of this is that within a single theta cycle (blue-shaded rectangle, for example) the cells fire in the same sequence in time as their triggering is organized in space: thus converting a spatial code into a temporal one.

There have been conflicting theories of how neurons in and around the hippocampus give rise to theta waves and consequently give rise to phase precession. As these mechanisms became better understood, the existence of phase precession was increasingly accepted by researchers. This, in turn, gave rise to the question of whether phase precession could be observed in any other regions of the brain, with other kinds of cell circuits, or whether phase precession was a peculiar property of hippocampal tissue. The finding that theta wave phase precession is also a property of grid cells in the entorhinal cortex demonstrated that the phenomenon exists in other parts of the brain that also mediate information about movement.

Theta wave phase precession in the hippocampus also plays a role in some brain functions that are unrelated to spatial location. When rats were trained to jump up to the rim of a box, place cells displayed phase precession much as they do during movement along a path, but a subset of the place cells showed phase precession that was related to initiating the jump, independently of spatial location, and not related to the position during the jump.

Phase precession in the entorhinal cortex has been hypothesized to arise from an attractor network process, so that two sequential neural representations within a single cycle of the theta oscillation can be temporally linked to each other downstream in the hippocampus, as episodic memories.
