= John O'Keefe (neuroscientist) =

American–Irish neuroscientist

John O'Keefe FRS FMedSci
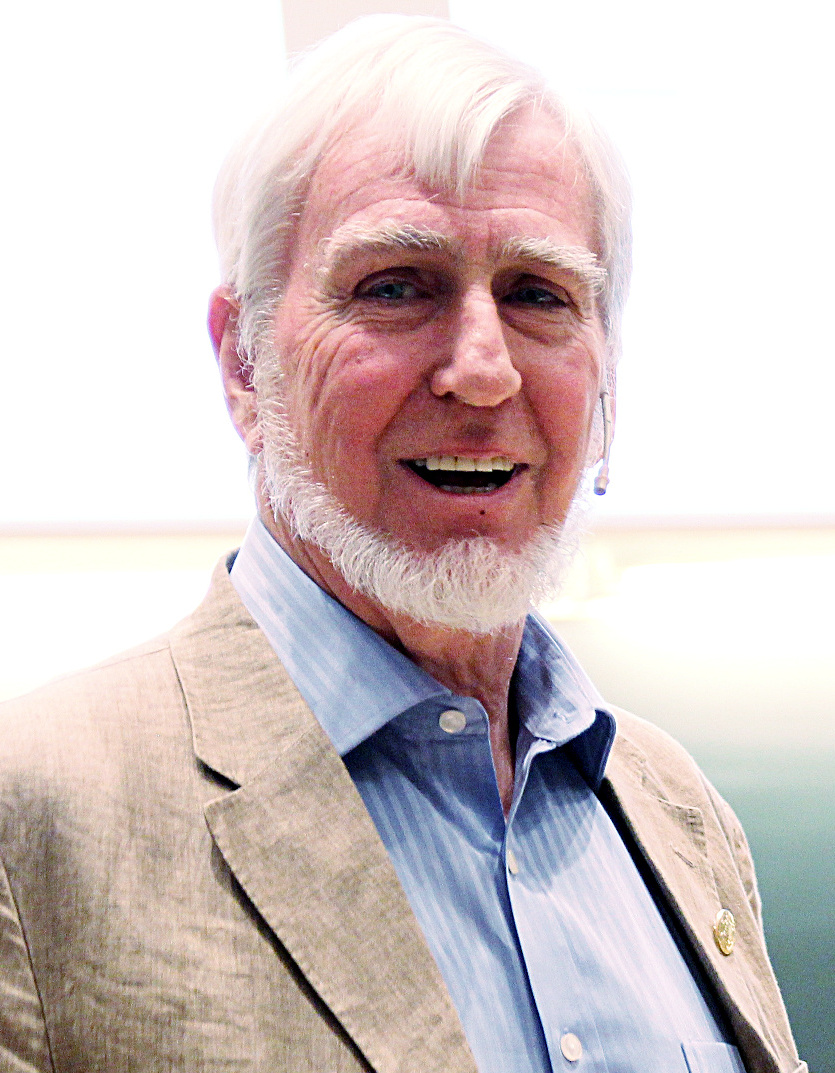
- O'Keefe in 2014
- Born: November 18, 1939 (age 86); New York City, U.S.
- Citizenship: United States; United Kingdom
- Education: City College of New York (BA); McGill University (MA, PhD)
- Known for: Discovery of place cells
- Awards: Gruber Prize in Neuroscience (2008); Louisa Gross Horwitz Prize (2013); Nobel Prize in Physiology or Medicine (2014); Kavli Prize (2014); Physiological Society Annual Review Prize Lecture (2016)
- Scientific career
- Fields: Neuroscience; Psychology
- Workplaces: University College London
- Thesis: Response properties of amygdalar units in the freely moving cat (1967)
- Doctoral advisor: Ronald Melzack
- Notable students: Neil Burgess
- Website: Website at UCL

John Michael O'Keefe (born November 18, 1939) is an American-British neuroscientist, psychologist and a professor at University College London.

O'Keefe discovered place cells in the hippocampus, and that they show a specific kind of temporal coding in the form of theta phase precession. He shared the Nobel Prize in Physiology or Medicine in 2014, together with May-Britt Moser and Edvard Moser; he has received several other awards.

== Early life and education ==
Born in New York City to Irish immigrant parents, O'Keefe attended Regis High School (Manhattan) and received a BA degree from the City College of New York in 1963. Neither of his parents had completed elementary school in Ireland, but his father attained a high school degree in New York. He went on to study at McGill University in Montreal, Quebec, Canada, where he obtained an MA degree in 1964, and a PhD degree in Psychology in 1967, supervised by Ronald Melzack.

== Career and research ==
O'Keefe went to University College London in 1967 as a US NIMH postdoctoral research fellow working with the late Patrick Wall. He has been there ever since and was promoted to Professor in 1987. At the behest of his collaborators Edvard Moser and May-Britt Moser he was appointed to a part-time professorial chair at the Norwegian University of Science and Technology in 2014.

=== Discovery of place cells ===
O’Keefe and his student Jonathan Dostrovsky discovered place cells by systematically analyzing the environmental factors influencing the firing properties of individual hippocampal neurons. His many publications on place cells have been highly cited. In addition, he published an influential book with Lynn Nadel, proposing the functional role of the hippocampus as a cognitive map for spatial memory function. In extensions of his work, place cells have been analyzed experimentally or simulated in models in hundreds of papers.

=== Discovery of theta phase precession ===
In further research on place cells, O’Keefe found evidence for a distinctive variation of temporal coding of information by the timing of action potentials in place cells, relative to an oscillatory EEG cycle known as the theta rhythm, as opposed to spike timing within a single cell. In a 1993 paper, he and Michael Recce demonstrated that place cells spike at different phases relative to theta rhythm oscillations in the local field potential of the hippocampus. As a rat enters the firing field of a place cell, the spiking starts at late phases of theta rhythm, and as the rat moves through the firing field, the spikes shift to earlier phases of the theta cycle. This effect has been replicated in numerous subsequent papers, providing evidence for the coding of sensory input by the timing of spikes. Numerous models have addressed the potential physiological mechanisms of theta phase precession.

=== Prediction and discovery of boundary vector cells ===
In a paper in 1996, O'Keefe and Neil Burgess presented data showing shifts in the position and size of place cell firing fields when the barriers defining the environment were shifted. In this and subsequent papers, they presented a model of this phenomenon predicting the existence of boundary vector cells that would respond at a specific distance from barriers in the environment. Several years later, this explicit theoretical prediction was supported by extensive experimental data demonstrating boundary cells with the predicted properties in the subiculum and the medial entorhinal cortex (where they are sometimes referred to as border cells). An influential 2006 review by O'Keefe and multiple collaborators presented an extended formulation of the boundary vector cell model. O'Keefe has also coauthored research on the oscillatory interference model of grid cell firing and on the regulation of grid cell firing by environmental geometry.

=== Awards and honours ===
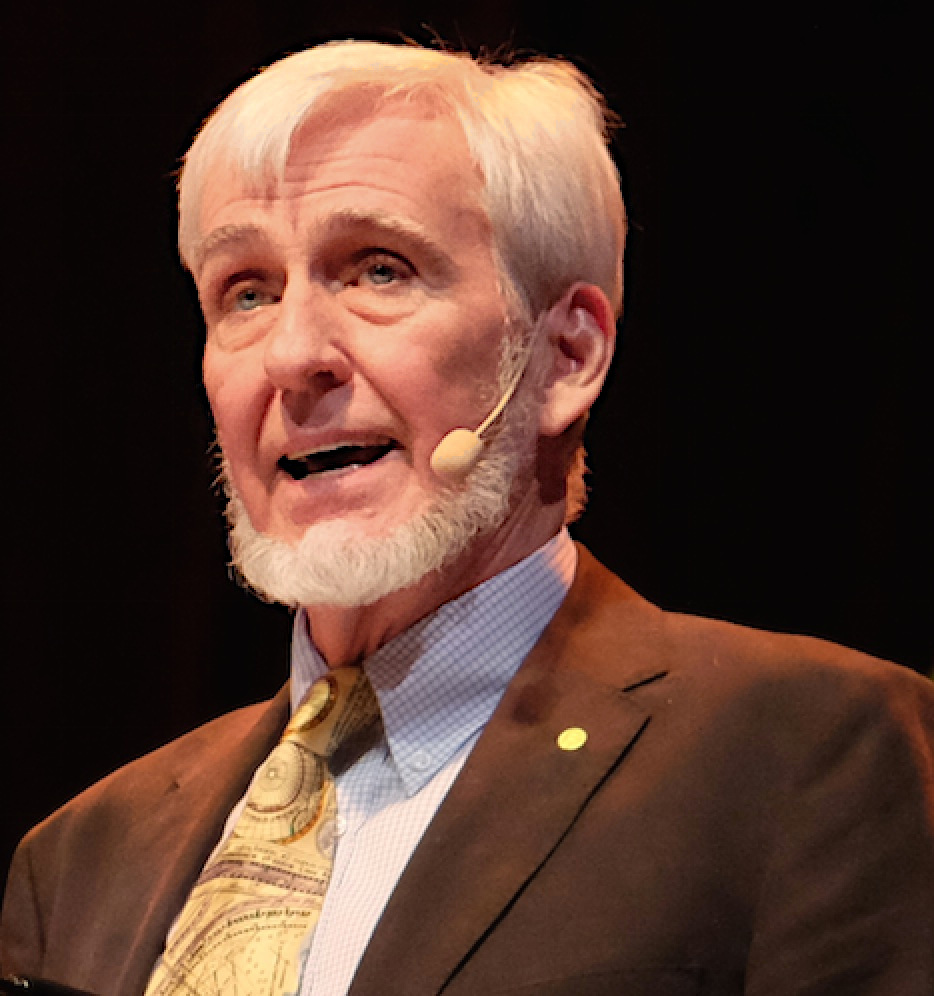
O'Keefe giving Nobel lecture in Oslo, December 2014

O'Keefe was elected a Fellow of the Royal Society (FRS) in 1992 and a Fellow of the Academy of Medical Sciences (FMedSci) in 1998. In addition, he received the Feldberg Foundation Prize in 2001 and the Grawemeyer Award in psychology in 2006 (with Lynn Nadel). In 2007, he received the British Neuroscience Association Award for Outstanding Contribution to British Neuroscience and in 2008 he received the Federation of European Neuroscience Societies European Journal of Neuroscience Award. Later in 2008, O'Keefe was awarded the Gruber Prize in Neuroscience. He was appointed as the inaugural director of the Sainsbury Wellcome Centre for Neural Circuits and Behaviour. In 2013 he received the Louisa Gross Horwitz Prize (with Edvard Moser and May-Britt Moser). In 2014, he was a co-recipient of the Kavli Prize awarded by the Norwegian Academy of Science and Letters with Brenda Milner and Marcus Raichle. In 2016 he was elected to the National Academy of Sciences. In 2019, he was admitted to the Royal Irish Academy as an honorary member.

O'Keefe was awarded the Nobel Prize in Physiology or Medicine 2014, with May-Britt Moser and Edvard Moser.

O'Keefe received an honorary Doctor of Science degree from University College Cork on December 15, 2014. In May 2015, he received one from The City College of New York, and in June of the same year, he was awarded one from McGill University, both his alma maters.

In 2014 he received the Kavli Prize in Neuroscience "for the discovery of specialized brain networks for memory and cognition", together with Brenda Milner and Marcus Raichle.

On March 10, 2015, O'Keefe was the guest on BBC Radio 4's The Life Scientific.
