= Head direction =

Head direction may refer to:

- Head direction cells in biology
- Head-directionality parameter in linguistics
