= Hippocampal replay =

Phenomenon observed in several animals

Hippocampal replay is a phenomenon observed in rats, mice, cats, rabbits, songbirds and monkeys. Although replay was first characterized in non-human animals, replay-like sequential reactivation has also been reported in humans using non-invasive methods such as simultaneous EEG–fMRI, where transient replay events are associated with hippocampal activity and coordinated changes across large-scale brain networks. During sleep or awake rest, replay refers to the re-occurrence of a sequence of cell activations that also occurred during activity, but the replay has a much faster time scale. It may be in the same order, or in reverse. Cases were also found where a sequence of activations occurs before the actual activity, but it is still the same sequence. This is called preplay.

The phenomenon has mostly been observed in the hippocampus, a brain region associated with memory and spatial navigation. Specifically, the cells that exhibit this behavior are place cells, characterized by reliably increasing their activity when the animal is in a certain location in space. During navigation, the place cells fire in a sequence according to the path of the animal. In a replay instance, the cells are activated as if in response to the same spatial path, but at a much faster rate than the animal actually moved in. Hippocampal replay has been proposed to support memory consolidation and the construction of internal "cognitive maps" of space and events. More recent computational and behavioral work suggests that replay may also contribute to planning and flexible decision making by allowing prospective sequences of states or actions to be evaluated before they are executed.

== Background ==
Place cell activity was already well established when the first study explored this phenomenon in 1989. They showed that neural activity of single place cells during sleep resembled the activity during the awake state. This activity was greater than that of other cells and this study was only the first step towards understanding replay. Subsequent studies showed that large groups of cells also demonstrated this type of increased activity during sleep. In addition, it was discovered that the order of activity of place cells was also replicated during sleep. Firing sequences of three and more neurons observed in the hippocampus during locomotion were shown to recur selectively during subsequent slow-wave sleep more likely than during the preceding sleep, and the sequence replay was compressed during high frequency oscillations. These high frequency field oscillations called ripples were observed in the sleep state and later shown to play a causal role in memory consolidation.

The next step was the discovery of replay during the awake state. In 1999, ten years after the initial discovery, neural recordings in the awake state were also shown to have replay activity. It is considerably more difficult to detect this activity in the awake state and several methods including Bayesian decoding have been used to quantify replay events that occur during short wave ripples. Recent advances include finding that replay can occur in reverse and that it has also been found to occur in different environments. The role of replay in memory consolidation in these different conditions and environments is still being explored and several theories attempt to answer this question.

== Location and behavioral state ==
Replay can occur in several different behavioral, physiological, and environmental conditions. The first distinction between awake and sleep states may represent different roles in memory consolidation. In the sleep state, the ripple events and place cell activity similar to that of the activity in the environment define the replay events. In the sleep state, there is also a distinction between REM (rapid eye movement) and SWS (slow wave sleep) which has implications for replay events. During SWS the place cells fire in a sequential order indicating replay and possibly indicate memory consolidation. However, during REM sleep where dreams occur in humans, replay events also occurred suggesting a possible role for place cells in dreams.

In the awake state the same activity occurs, however it is more difficult to detect and the animal must be in a resting state. Lastly, there are many environments for replay events in the awake animal. The length of the track can be short or long and still be replayed by a population of place cells. In addition, replay of a single environment can occur when the animal is in that environment or in different environments. This may show that consolidation of memory is a persistent process that may occur in several different types of environments and behavioral conditions. The robustness of the replay events indicates the importance of this process.

Recent research suggests that replay during sleep is organized by the microstructure of non-REM sleep. Different non-REM sleep substate were related to the replay of different memory experiences. Disrupting sharp-wave ripple of one of these substates impaired recall of recently learned information, thus timing of replay-related activity influences memory consolidation.

== Preplay ==
As mentioned above, the sequential activation of hippocampal place cells according to their place fields may occur during rest periods before the animal is actually traversing the activated path, even if the animal has never experienced it before. This suggests that hippocampal activation during rest may have a function not only in memory consolidation and retrieval, but also in planning: it contributes to the organization of the network for improving the encoding of future events.

== Sensory cue for activation ==
Sensory stimuli can induce replay events or enhance the replay: in the awake state, replay often begins from the current location and continue either forward or backward in time, and nearby locations are more likely to be the place fields of neurons exhibiting replay than far away locations. This is like cued memory retrieval, where a sensory input triggers retrieval of similar or relevant memories. The cue may even trigger a replay in a different environment, if the place cells cued represent a location in a different environment in addition to the current location of the animal.

== Interaction with cortex ==
Several studies are beginning to understand that replay may not only occur in the hippocampus. Replay has been linked to coherent activity in cortical regions of the default mode network. In humans, simultaneous EEG–fMRI measurements have shown that replay-like events are accompanied by widespread activation across the hippocampus, medial prefrontal cortex, posterior cingulate cortex, and other regions of the default mode network, indicating that replay is embedded in coordinated activity patterns across large-scale brain networks. After learning, similar replay events occurred in both the thalamus and cortex. In addition, the visual cortex showed population activity that was both coordinated into discrete time regions and that it occurred simultaneously with activity in the hippocampus. Replay is also coordinated upstream of the hippocampus, in the entorhinal cortex: Hippocampal place-cell replay during rest is accompanied by simultaneous reactivation of grid cells, indicating that the replay phenomenon is not confined to the hippocampus proper. These findings, together with the large-scale activation patterns reported in humans, suggest that replay-related activity is not confined to the hippocampus but reflects coordinated interactions between hippocampal circuits and distributed cortical networks. Concurrent re-activation in the hippocampus and cortex may demonstrate that memory consolidation requires cortical input/output to maintain a memory. This hypothesis fits well with the idea that the cortex plays an integral role in memory retrieval after consolidation occurs. Therefore, hippocampal replay may play the role of information transfer between the hippocampus and cortex, yet this idea requires further verification. Human neuroimaging results demonstrating replay-triggered activation across distributed cortical regions further support the idea that replay contributes to information exchange within large-scale networks involved in memory and internally directed cognition.}

== Function in memory ==
Hippocampal replay in the awake state has been implicated, though not demonstrated, to correlate with performance in navigation tasks after the replay event. As researchers assumed correlation between replay and memory consolidation, recent studies showed that replay-related activity contribute to memory processing. Sharp-wave ripple provide specific experiences that are more likely to be replayed during sleep, hence aids memory consolidation. However, sleep deprivation reduce hippocampal reactivation and replay even when sharp-wave ripple occurs. This indicates that the ripple alone may not be sufficient for memory replay. Furthermore, replay also seems to be related to memory retrieval: it is activated by cues that also trigger memory retrieval, and in situations that require it, such as planning a trajectory based on the consequences of past choices. This relationship is also still only correlative, but there are studies showing evidence for the necessity of replay in successful memory retrieval. In addition to retrieval, hippocampal replay has been proposed to support prospective evaluation during decision making, where internally generated sequences allow an organism to compare possible future actions before choosing a path. Consistent with such a role, place-cell sequences during rest can also construct trajectories through regions of space that the animal has not visited, suggesting that replay can support imagined or planned trajectories. Computational modeling has shown that replay-like sequences can act as internal simulations (“rollouts”) that support goal-directed behavior by passing predictive information to frontal control circuits involved in planning. Experimental work in humans also indicates that the timing and frequency of replay-like events during rest can relate to subsequent planning performance, consistent with the idea that replay contributes to flexible, model-based decision making.} The content of awake hippocampal replay has also been shown to shift dynamically with task demand.

Replay is likely to participate in both the consolidation of memories and in building a cognitive map. Replay is also likely to play an important role in generating and maintaining a value map, which is a proposed variation of cognitive map in which memories are reinforced according to their values. Replay has also been implicated in neurodegeneration: in a mouse model of Alzheimer's disease, hippocampal replay persists but its temporal structure breaks down as pathology progresses, with the disruption associated with reduced offline stabilisation of the cognitive map.
