= BigBrain =

BigBrain is a freely accessible high-resolution 3D digital atlas of the human brain, released in June 2013 by a team of researchers at the Montreal Neurological Institute and the German Forschungszentrum Jülich and is part of the European Human Brain Project.The isotropic 3D spatial resolution of the BigBrain atlas is 20 μm, much finer than the typical 1 mm resolution of other existing 3D models of the human brain such as the Allen Brain Atlas. In 2014, BigBrain was cited in the top 10 MIT Technology Review.

== Acquisition ==
The atlas was created from the brain of an unidentified 65-year-old man (it was "65-year-old female", according to "BigBrain: An Ultrahigh-Resolution3D Human Brain Model", page 1472, Amunts K et al., SCIENCE, 21 JUNE 2013 VOL 340) who died with no known brain pathology. His brain, after being removed from the skull, was first scanned using an MRI machine, then embedded in paraffin and sliced into 7,404 20 μm thick sections using a large-scale microtome. After each section was removed, the uncut face was photographed in order to provide an additional reference for removing distortion. The brain sections were placed on large glass slides and then stained for cell bodies using the Merker method, a process that causes the grey matter in the brain to be darkly stained while leaving the white matter uncoloured. The stained sections were scanned and digitized using a flatbed scanner at 2400dpi, creating a one terabyte raw record. The acquisition process took about 1,000 hours of labor.

== Image processing ==
The resulting digital images were then processed by human operators to remove artifacts, and by software to align them with the reference images and with neighbouring sections, thereby correcting distortions that inevitably arise during histological processing. The corrected data were then assembled into a three-dimensional computer model with a spatial isotropic 3D resolution of 20 μm. The atlas took five years to complete. Announced plans include mapping additional brains and providing tools to allow brain scans from medical patients to be aligned to the BigBrain structure.

== Accessibility ==
The dataset is available for download at bigbrain.loris.ca and can be explored online with the EBRAINS siibra explorer. More datasets and tools are provided through bigbrainproject.org.

== See also ==
- Outline of brain mapping
- Outline of the human brain
