= David Redish =

Scientist at the University of Minnesota

Aaron David Redish (born 1969) is a Distinguished McKnight University Professor of Neuroscience at the University of Minnesota.

== Education ==
Redish graduated from Johns Hopkins University in 1991, having completed a double major in Computer Science and Writing Seminars. He then earned a PhD in Computer Science from Carnegie Mellon University, where he was part of the first class of the nascent Center for the Neural Basis of Cognition. After receiving his PhD in 1997, he did postdoctoral work with Carol A. Barnes at the University of Arizona. He joined the Department of Neuroscience at the University of Minnesota as an assistant professor in 2000 and has been there since.

== Career and research ==
Redish is a Distinguished McKnight University Professor of Neuroscience at the University of Minnesota. He was the Director of Graduate Studies for the Department of Neuroscience from 2014 to 2019.

Redish is a published and cited researcher in Computational Neuroscience and Computational Psychiatry, with over 120 publications and over 9,000 citations. His first published papers were computational models of the head direction system in the rodent (see) which have since been confirmed in both mammals (see) and drosophila (see). Redish then shifted his focus to computational models of rodent navigation and the role of the hippocampus, culminating in a large-scale synthesis which unified the conflicting perspectives on spatial navigation and episodic memory in hippocampus into a single computational model (see). He studies planning and decision making in rodents, and has argued that this planning system is one of multiple decision-systems. Much of Redish's more recent work has addressed how the computational processes underlying multiple decision-making systems impact fields beyond neuroscience, including economics (see). Redish is also well known for his work in computational psychiatry, starting from his groundbreaking research in addiction (see).

In 2015, Redish organized a Strungmann Forum on Computational Psychiatry with NIH Director Joshua Gordon, bringing together practicing clinicians and computational neuroscientists. He currently co-directs the NeuroPlasticity Research in Support of Mental Health (NeuroPRSMH group, which is known for translational neuroscience and cross-species translation.

== Books ==
David Redish has published several books in his academic field. ISBN 0-7475-3269-9

- A.D. Redish (1999) Beyond the Cognitive Map: From Place Cells to Episodic Memory, MIT Press. ISBN 0-262-18194-0
- A. D. Redish (2013) The Mind within the Brain: How we make decisions and how those decisions go wrong, Oxford University Press. ISBN 0-1902-6317-2
- A. D. Redish, J. A. Gordon [eds] (2016) Computational Psychiatry: New Perspectives on Mental Illness. A Strungmann Forum Report, MIT Press. ISBN 978-0-2623-3785-4
- A. D. Redish (2022) Changing how we choose: the new science of morality, MIT Press. ISBN 978-0-2620-4736-4

== Awards and honors ==
- 2021 Academy of Excellence, University of Minnesota
- 2014–2015 Hebb Lecture, McGill University
- 2010–2013 Human Frontiers Science Program Project Award
- 2003–2005 Alfred P. Sloan Fellow
- 2002–2004 McKnight Technology Innovation in Neuroscience Award
- 1998 Distinguished Thesis Award: Computer Science Department, Carnegie Mellon University
