= Craterization =

Craterization refers to cutting out part of bone, such as in osteomyelitis. It may refer to the creating of craters in the ground following explosions. The term is also used to describe how craters form in volcanos.

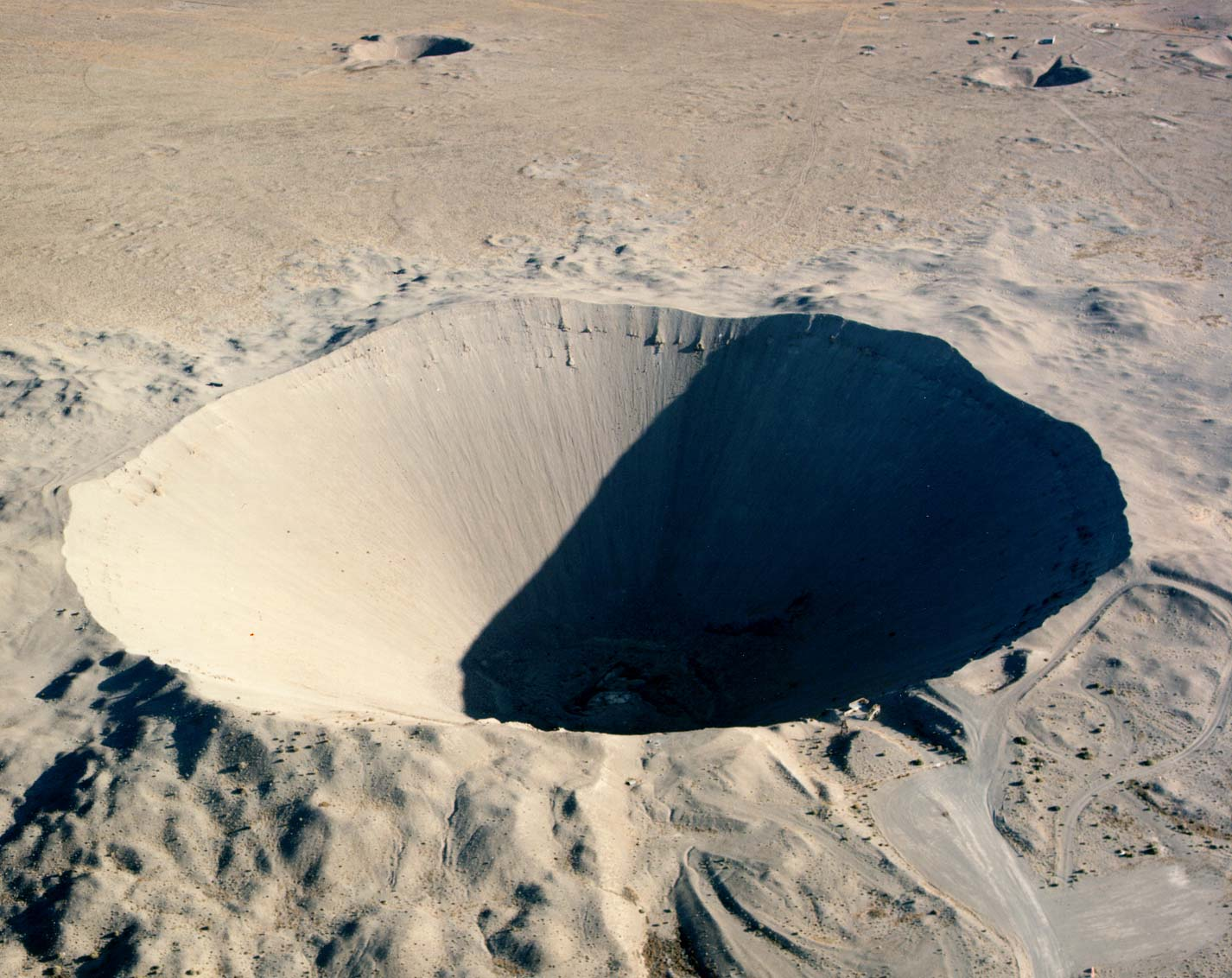
Crater following explosion

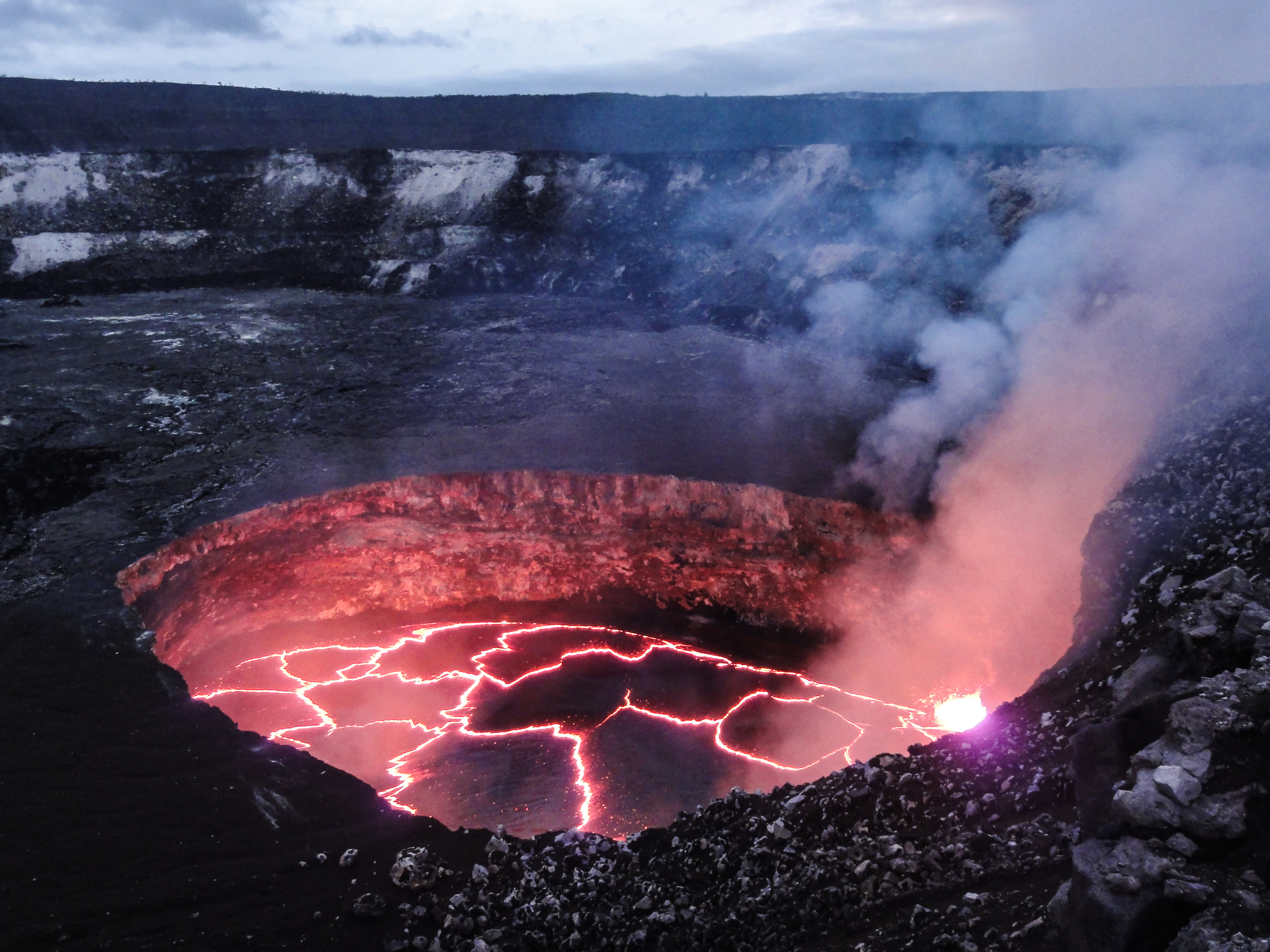
Volcanic crater
