= Spatial view cells =

Spatial view cells are neurons in primates' hippocampus; they respond when a certain part of the environment is in the animal's field of view.

They are related to place cells and head direction cells. Spatial view cells differ from place cells, since they are not localized in space. They also differ from head direction cells since they don't represent a global orientation (like a compass), but the direction towards a specific object. Spatial view cells are the cells that respond in the hippocampus when a particular location is being recalled. These cells are identified in the hippocampus of test subjects by monitoring individual neurons while the test subject is moved around in a cue controlled spatial environment. The spatial view cells are the cells that fire consistently when the monkey is looking at a certain direction in the environment; this is independent of the head direction or the location of the monkey. Also, these cells are confirmed to be spatial view cells by observing that there is minimal randomized firing of the cells without the appropriate stimulus present.

== Characteristics ==
Spatial view cells can be characterized by the following features:

- respond to a region of visual space being looked at, relatively independently of where the monkey is located
- respond to a small number of visual cues generally within a 30° receptive field
- activated when doing spatial tasks which include active walking in a spatial environment
- fire relatively independent of the place where the monkey is located
- represent the place at which the monkey is looking
- generally stimulated by at least 3 cues present in optimal view
- fire uniformly all over different areas in space as long as monkey is looking at the same area
- ability to maintain their spatial properties for periods of up to several minutes in the dark
- responses depend on where the monkey is looking, by measuring eye position
- spatial representation is allocentric
- responses still occur in some cases even if view details are obscured with curtains

The spatial view cells that respond in the absence of visual cues are generally found in the Cornu Ammonis area 1, the parahippocampal gyrus, and the presubiculum, while the ones that do not respond are found in the Cornu Ammonis region 3. The cells found in the CA1, parahippocampal gyrus, and presubiculum regions often provide a longer response even after the stimulus is removed for up to several minutes in complete darkness. Spatial view cells update their representations by the use of idiothetic inputs in the dark and these cells are commonly found in the CA1, parahippocampal gyrus, and presubiculum regions.

== Uses ==
Spatial view cells are used by primates for storing an episodic memory that helps with remembering where a particular object was in the environment. Imaging studies have shown that the hippocampus plays an important role in spatial navigation and episodic memories. Also, spatial view cells enable them to recall locations of objects even if they are not physically present in the environment. The neurons associated with remembering the location and object are often found in the primate hippocampus. These spatial view cells do not only recall specific locations, but they also remember distances between other landmarks around the place in order to gain a better understanding of where the places are spatially.

In real world applications, monkeys remember where they saw ripe fruit with the aid of spatial view cells. Humans use spatial view cells when they try to recall where they may have seen a person or where they left their keys. Primates' highly developed visual and eye movement control systems enables them to explore and remember information about what's present at places in the environment without having to physically visit those places. These sorts of memories would be useful for spatial navigation in which the primates visualize everything in an allocentric, or worldly manner that allows them to convey directions to others without physically going through the entire route. These cells are used by primates in regular day-to-day lives.

== Removal of spatial view cell ==
Diseases and illnesses that harm the brain and the hippocampus can also damage spatial view cells, which are located in the hippocampus. Strokes, meningitis, and encephalitis are only a few of the various illnesses that can cause harm to the spatial view cells. Some clinical symptoms present in patients with damage to the central nervous system include: fever, altered mental status, and neck stiffness. Lesion studies have shown that damage to the hippocampus or to some of its connections, such as the fornix, in monkeys produces deficits in learning about the places of objects and about the places where responses should be made. This sort of damage to the brain often results in impaired object-place memory. Object-place memory tasks require the monkey to not only remember the object seen, but they must also remember where the object was seen in the environment. It has been shown that posterior para-hippocampal lesions in macaques impair even a simple type of object-place learning in which only one pair of unique stimuli are needed for memory.

=== Relationship to other diseases ===
Patients with damage to spatial view cells will often show similar symptoms from other diseases such as: vascular dementia, Alzheimer's disease, amnesia fugue, macular degeneration, and optic nerve damage. Another illness that reflects signs of spatial view damage is fornix lesions that impair conditional left–right discrimination learning. Patients with damage to the temporal lobe which also includes the hippocampus can sometimes have amnesia. Patients with amnesia often have memory impairments in which they have difficulty remembering both what they saw and where they saw the object or event take place. These signs point to the possible damage to spatial view cells found in the hippocampus.

== Current research involving spatial view cells ==
=== Optimal firing rate ===
Current research shows that the maximum firing rate of spatial view cells is obtained when the test agent is allowed to explore the environment freely. Tests in which the monkey was not allowed to have active locomotion provided very few results of spatial view cells being detected in the hippocampus. Majority of the experiments conducted for spatial view cells involved the use of macaque monkeys as test subjects. These types of cells are identified by monitoring the hippocampus of the monkeys while the brains are stimulated by presenting various images and objects in the monkey's vision. Various researchers use different methodologies in sync with the experiment being conducted in order to identify these spatial view cells. For example, in a delayed spatial response task, the monkey is shown a stimulus on one side of a screen and then the stimulus is taken away. After a short while, the stimulus is again presented to the monkey in the same location and the firing of the cell in the hippocampus that is specifically associated with the location at which the monkey is looking and is independent of the location of the monkey helps identify the spatial view cell. The monkeys in this of experiment are encouraged by rewarding them with fruit juice when they correctly identify the same object in the same location twice in a row and if they get it incorrect, the monkeys receive a saline taste.

=== Association with episodic memories ===
The experiments often use object-place memory tasks because they are representative of episodic memories and often employ similar parts of the brain. It is also believed that whenever an episodic memory is stored, part of the context from that event is also stored along with it. As a result, recalling a certain place can link up the emotions at that time. These recollections do not only happen if a place is recalled, but they are prone to occur if the person is in the same mood as they were at the time of the event. Rewards are also remembered along with the place at which it was received. Spatial view cells have been proven to be independent of head direction and place cells. Spatial view cells have been shown to respond even in the dark without any visual cues as long as the test subject was facing in the proper direction. It is believed that in the absence of visual cues, spatial view cells respond from the inputs being received from head direction cells and place cells along with eye position of the primate. The use of the vestibular system and proprioceptive cues also provide a sense of direction the animal is facing in the dark.

=== Ability to update with new information ===
Research has led to the finding the spatial view cells are consistently updated with other inputs from the body. For example, when a monkey is oriented in a different position spatially such as being upside down, the spatial view cells still respond when the test subject faces the appropriate direction. This implies that there is stream of new information being received by the spatial view cells constantly. This integration from various inputs develops continuous attractor networks. Continuous attractor neural networks, also known as CANN, are routinely used when studying spatial view cells from an idiothetic stand point. CANNs allow researchers to closely monitor the associated head direction cells and place cells along with the spatial view cells as one close "packet of neural activity".
