= Boundary cell =

Boundary cells (also known as border cells or boundary vector cells) are neurons found in the hippocampal formation that respond to the presence of an environmental boundary at a particular distance and direction from an animal. The existence of cells with these firing characteristics were first predicted on the basis of properties of place cells. Boundary cells were subsequently discovered in several regions of the hippocampal formation: the subiculum, presubiculum and entorhinal cortex.

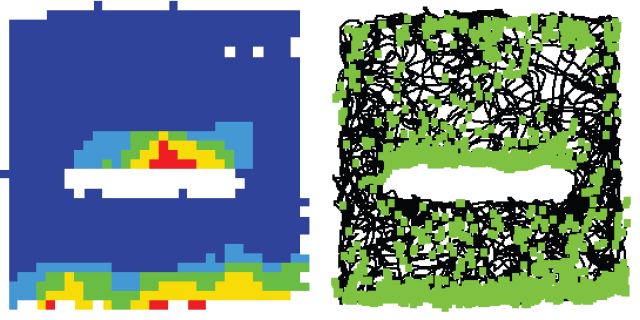
Firing of a boundary cell recorded in rat subiculum in 1 × 1 metre square-walled box with 50 cm-high walls. A 50 cm-long barrier inserted into box elicits second field along north side of barrier in addition to original field along south wall. Left: Firing rate map, one of 5 colours in locational bin indicates spatially-smoothed firing rate in that bin (autoscaled to firing rate peak, dark blue: 0-20%; light blue: 20-40%; green: 40-60%; yellow: 60-80%; red: 80-100%. The maximum firing rate is 14.2 Hz). Right: path taken by rat is shown in black, locations where spikes were recorded indicated by green squares.

O'Keefe and Burgess had noted that the firing fields of place cells, which characteristically respond only in a circumscribed area of an animal's environment, tended to fire in 'corresponding' locations when the shape and size of the environment was altered. For example, a place cell that fired in the northeastern corner of a rectangular environment might continue to fire in the northeastern corner when the size of the environment was doubled. To explain these observations, the Burgess and O'Keefe groups developed a computational model (Boundary Vector Cell - or BVC - model) of place cells that relied on inputs sensitive to the geometry of the environment to determine where a given place cell would fire in environments of different shapes and sizes. The hypothetical input cells (BVCs) responded to environmental boundaries at particular distances and allocentric directions from the rat.

Separate studies emerging from different research groups identified cells with these characteristics in the subiculum, entorhinal cortex and pre- and para-subiculum where they were described variously as "BVCs", "boundary cells" and "border cells". These terms are somewhat interchangeable; the critical defining functional characteristics of associated with the different labelling schemes are rather arbitrary and any functional differences in cells found in different anatomical regions are not yet fully clear. For example, neurons classified as "border cells" may include some that fire at short range to any environmental boundary (regardless of direction). Additionally, the BVC model predicted the existence of a small proportion of cells with longer range tunings (i.e., firing parallel to, but at some distance from boundaries) and few such cells have been described to date. In general, although the general predictions of the BVC model regarding the existence of geometric boundary sensitive inputs were confirmed by the empirical observations it prompted, the more detailed characteristics such as the distribution of distance and direction tunings remain to be determined.

While the hippocampal formation largely encodes information regarding the environmental layout through an allocentric (world-oriented) reference frame, organisms must first perceive this information in an egocentric (self-oriented) reference frame before undergoing intentional movement. Egocentric boundary cells (EBCs) located within the dorsomedial striatum are attributed to this self-oriented encoding of environmental boundaries. Testing with mice has revealed evidence of neurons located within the dorsomedial striatum that each have consistent activation when the mouse is at a certain distance and angle from nearby boundaries. Different EBCs have varying firing patterns, suggesting that different neurons within the dorsomedial striatum are specialized to respond to their own unique combination of distance and orientation relative to boundaries regardless of the animal's familiarity with the environment. Current research suggests that there exists a strong connection between the allocentric and egocentric representations of environments: both the static environmental map and the dynamic positional details are needed for intentional movement.

In medial entorhinal cortex border/boundary cells comprise about 10% of local population, being intermingled with grid cells and head direction cells. During development MEC border cells (and HD cells but not grid cells) show adult-like firing fields as soon as rats are able to freely explore their environment at around 16–18 days old. This suggests HD and border cells, rather than grid cells, provide the first critical spatial input to hippocampal place cells.

== See also ==
- Place cell
- Head direction cell
- Grid cell
- Speed cells
- List of distinct cell types in the adult human body
