= James B. Ranck Jr. =

American physiologist (born 1930)

- Born: August 17, 1930 (age 95); Frederick, Maryland
- Education: Haverford College, Columbia Medical School (MD 1955)
- Known for: Recording from single neurons in living animals for behavioral studies; discovery of Head-Direction cells
- Scientific career
- Fields: Physiology
- Institutions: University of Chicago, NIH, University of Washington
- Academic advisors: Walter Woodbury

James B. Ranck Jr. (born 1930) is a distinguished professor of Physiology at the SUNY Downstate Medical Center. His research involves recording from single neurons in living animals for behavioral studies. He discovered head-direction cells in 1984.

== Early life and education ==
Ranck was born August 17, 1930, in Frederick, Maryland, where his father was a history teacher at Hood College. He attended Haverford College (BA, 1951) and Columbia Medical School (MD, 1955). He interned at the University of Chicago (55-56) and worked at the Laboratory of Neuroanatomy at NIH (1956–58). After NIH he did post-doctoral work in the laboratory of Walter Woodbury at the University of Washington from 1959 to 1960, and was an instructor in biophysics at the same institution (60-61).

== Career ==
Ranck's initial faculty appointment was at the University of Michigan, Dept of Physiology from 1962 to 1975. He was appointed as professor in the Department of Physiology at Downstate in 1975, and distinguished Professor there in 2005.

== Research ==
There have been two distinct phases to Ranck's research career. From 1959 until 1973 Ranck analyzed the flow of electric current in brain, electrical properties of glia, electric impedance of brain, release of potassium from neurons in a seizure, and which elements are activated in electric stimulation of brain.

In 1967, while analyzing the biophysical properties of the subiculum he found that impedance increased in REM sleep. Using recently developed small, sturdy field effect transistors, he then started to record from single neurons in the hippocampal formation in behaving rats. From 1967 to 1969 Ranck tried numerous electronic and surgical approaches before getting stable single-neuron recordings. Enabled by these new recording methods, Ranck' began to study the firing properties and behavioral correlates of neurons in the limbic system.

In the early phase Ranck studied impedance in the brain, providing basic data for any studies or procedures that employ electrical stimulation of the CNS. Later, he was among the first to record from single neurons in awake behaving animals (rats). At first he recorded from the hippocampus, and largely confirmed O'Keefe's description of place cells. In 1984, Ranck discovered Head-Direction cells in a neighboring structure, the post-subiculum, adding a second ingredient to the navigation system of the brain.

In collaboration with Steven Fox, Ranck characterized complex-spike cells and theta cells in the hippocampal formation. John Kubie and Ranck characterized hippocampal place cells in three separate environments and postulated that hippocampal neurons code context as well as place. Kubie, Bob Muller and Ranck then used quantitative, automated techniques to demonstrate the hippocampal place cells and describe their characteristics.

Ranck is best known for his discovery of Head-Direction cells. Before that time, scientists didn't know how 'directional sense' was coded in a mammal's brain, and it was assumed to be a complex function. Ranck, working alone, attempted to describe the firing properties of neurons in retro-hippocampal areas. He observed clear directional firing properties when neurons were recorded in the dorsal pre-subiculum. Ranck made his initial report in a 1984 abstract for the meeting of the Society for Neuroscience. It took several years to get a stable two-spot recording system. Working with Jeffrey Taube and Bob Muller two papers were published in the Journal of Neuroscience in 1990.

== Selected publications ==
- Kubie, J. L. and J. B. Ranck, Jr.. 1983. Sensory-behavioral correlates of individual hippocampal neurons in three situations: space and context. In: Neurobiology of the Hippocampus. W. Seifert, editor. Academic Press
- Spatial firing patterns of hippocampal complex-spike cells in a fixed environment. Muller RU, Kubie JL, Ranck JB Jr. J Neurosci. 1987 Jul;7(7):1935-50.
- Studies on single neurons in dorsal hippocampal formation and septum in unrestrained rats. I. Behavioral correlates and firing repertoires. Ranck JB Jr. Exp Neurol. 1973 Nov;41(2):461-531.
- Studies on single neurons in dorsal hippocampal formation and septum in unrestrained rats. II. Hippocampal slow waves and theta cell firing during bar pressing and other behaviors. Feder R, Ranck JB Jr. Exp Neurol. 1973 Nov;41(2):532-55.
- Which elements are excited in electrical stimulation of mammalian central nervous system: a review. Ranck JB Jr. Brain Res. 1975 Nov 21;98(3):417-40. Review.
- Electrical impedance in the subicular area of rats during paradoxical sleep. Ranck JB Jr. Exp Neurol. 1966 Dec;16(4):416-37.
- Ranck JB Jr (1984) Head direction cells in the deep layer of dorsal presubiculum in freely moving rats. Soc Neurosci Abstr 10:599.
- Head-direction cells recorded from the postsubiculum in freely moving rats. I. Description and quantitative analysis. Taube JS, Muller RU, Ranck JB Jr. J Neurosci. 1990 Feb;10(2):420-35; Head-direction cells recorded from the postsubiculum in freely moving rats. II. Effects of environmental manipulations. Taube JS, Muller RU, Ranck JB Jr. J Neurosci. 1990 Feb;10(2):436-47.

== Personal life ==
Ranck married Helen Haukeness in 1961. They have a daughter, Mary Ranck Bolieu.
