= Grid cell =

Type of neuron

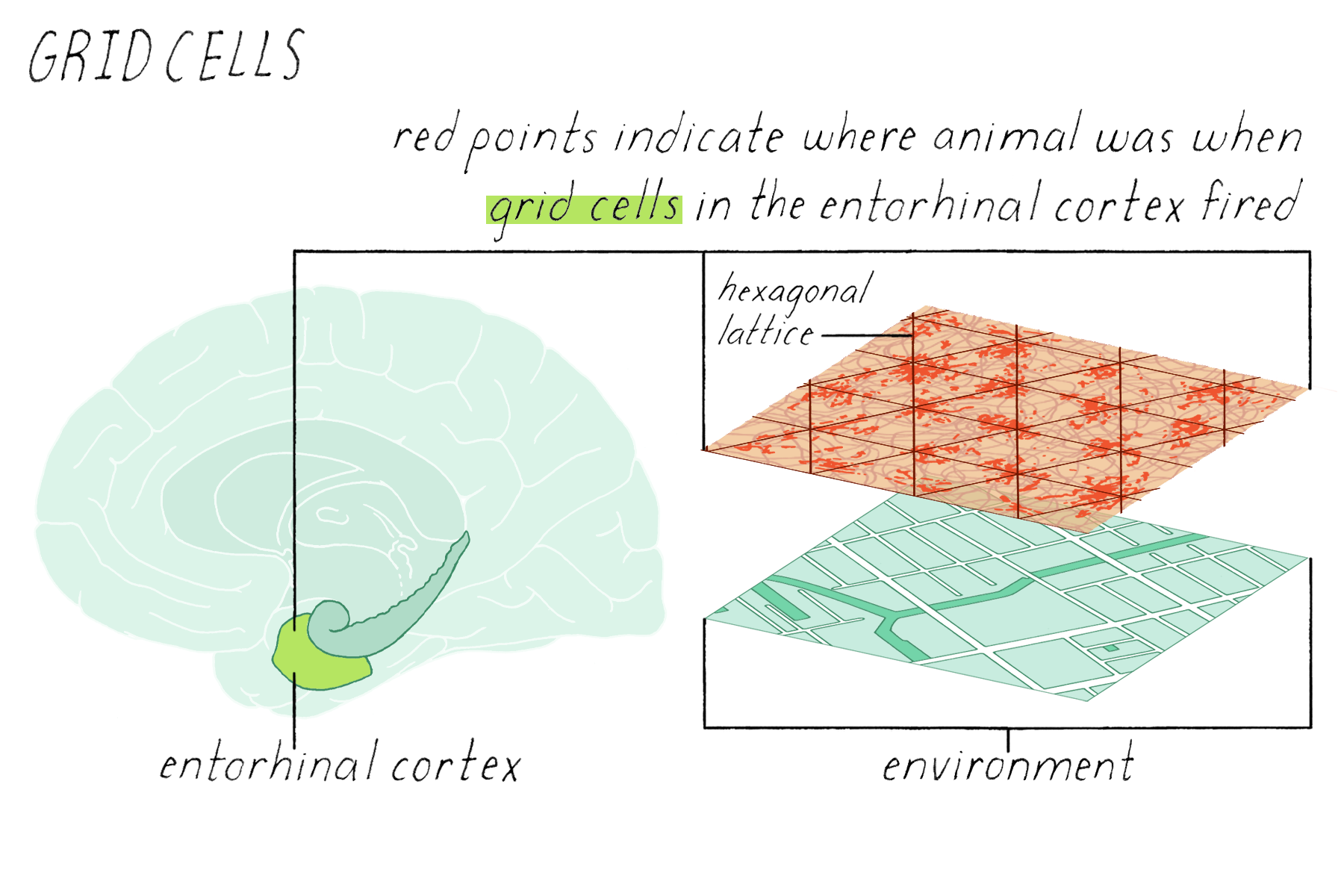
A grid cell is a type of neuron within the entorhinal cortex that fires as an animal moves in an open area and which helps the animal to form a spatial map of its environment.

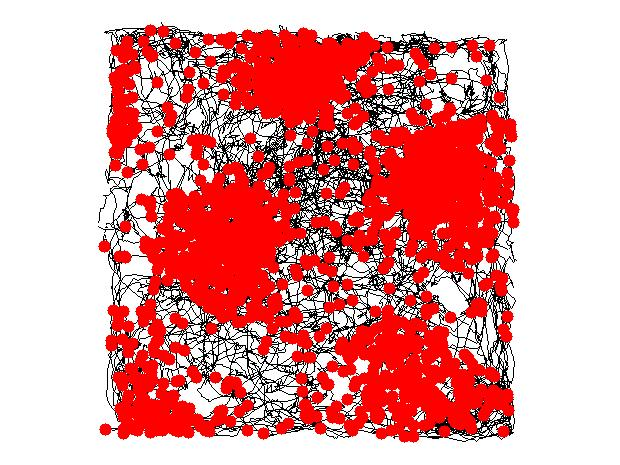
Trajectory of a rat through a square environment is shown in black. Red dots indicate locations at which a particular entorhinal grid cell fired.

A grid cell is a type of neuron within the entorhinal cortex that fires at regular intervals as an animal navigates an open area, allowing it to understand its position in space by storing and integrating information about location, distance, and direction. Grid cells have been found in many animals, including rats, mice, bats, monkeys, and humans.

Grid cells were discovered in 2005 by Edvard Moser, May-Britt Moser, and their students Torkel Hafting, Marianne Fyhn, and Sturla Molden at the Centre for the Biology of Memory (CBM) in Norway. They were awarded the 2014 Nobel Prize in Physiology or Medicine together with John O'Keefe for their discoveries of cells that constitute a positioning system in the brain. The arrangement of spatial firing fields, all at equal distances from their neighbors, led to a hypothesis that these cells encode a neural representation of Euclidean space. The discovery also suggested a mechanism for dynamic computation of self-position based on continuously updated information about position and direction.

Grid cells derive their name from the fact that connecting the centers of their firing fields gives a triangular grid.

To detect grid cell activity in a typical rat experiment, a microelectrode that can record single-neuron activity is implanted in the dorsomedial entorhinal cortex and collects recordings as the rat moves around freely in an open arena. The resulting data can be visualized by marking the rat's position on a map of the arena every time that neuron fires an action potential. These marks accumulate over time to form a set of small clusters, which in turn form the vertices of a grid of equilateral triangles. The regular triangle pattern distinguishes grid cells from other types of cells that show spatial firing. By contrast, if a place cell from the rat hippocampus is examined in the same way, then the marks will frequently only form one cluster (one "place field") in a given environment, and even when multiple clusters are seen, there is no perceptible regularity in their arrangement.

== Background of discovery ==
In 1971 John O'Keefe and Jonathon Dostrovsky reported the discovery of place cells in the rat hippocampus—cells that fire action potentials when an animal passes through a specific small region of space, which is called the place field of the cell. This discovery, although controversial at first, led to a series of investigations that culminated in the 1978 publication of a book by O'Keefe and his colleague Lynn Nadel called The Hippocampus as a Cognitive Map (a phrase that also appeared in the title of the 1971 paper)—the book argued that the hippocampal neural network instantiates cognitive maps as hypothesized by the psychologist Edward C. Tolman. This theory aroused a great deal of interest, and motivated hundreds of experimental studies aimed at clarifying the role of the hippocampus in spatial memory and spatial navigation.

Because the entorhinal cortex provides by far the largest input to the hippocampus, it was clearly important to understand the spatial firing properties of entorhinal neurons. The earliest studies, such as Quirk et al. (1992), described neurons in the entorhinal cortex as having relatively large and fuzzy place fields. But the Mosers thought it was possible that a different result would be obtained if recordings were made from a different part of the entorhinal cortex. The entorhinal cortex is a strip of tissue running along the back edge of the rat brain from the ventral to the dorsal sides. Anatomical studies had shown that different sectors of the entorhinal cortex project to different levels of the hippocampus: the dorsal end of the EC projects to the dorsal hippocampus, the ventral end to the ventral hippocampus. This was relevant because several studies had shown that place cells in the dorsal hippocampus have considerably sharper place fields than cells from more ventral levels. But every study of entorhinal spatial activity before 2004 had made use of electrodes implanted near the ventral end of the EC. Accordingly, together with Marianne Fyhn, Sturla Molden, and Menno Witter, the Mosers set out to examine spatial firing from the different dorsal-to-ventral levels of the entorhinal cortex. They found that in the dorsal part of medial entorhinal cortex (MEC), cells had sharply defined place fields like in the hippocampus but the cells fired at multiple locations. The arrangement of the firing fields showed hints of regularity, but the size of the environment was too small for spatial periodicity to be visible in this study.

The next set of experiments, reported in 2005, made use of a larger environment, which led to the recognition that the cells were actually firing in a hexagonal grid pattern. The study showed that cells at similar dorsal-to-ventral MEC levels had similar grid spacing and grid orientation, but that the phase of the grid (the offset of the grid vertices relative to the x and y axes) appeared to be randomly distributed between cells. The periodic firing pattern was expressed independently of the configuration of landmarks, in darkness as well as in the presence of visible landmarks and independently of changes in the animal's speed and direction, leading the authors to suggest that grid cells expressed a path-integration-dependent dynamic computation of the animal's location.

For their discovery of grid cells, May-Britt Moser, and Edvard Moser were awarded the Nobel Prize in Physiology or Medicine in 2014, alongside John O'Keefe.

== Properties ==
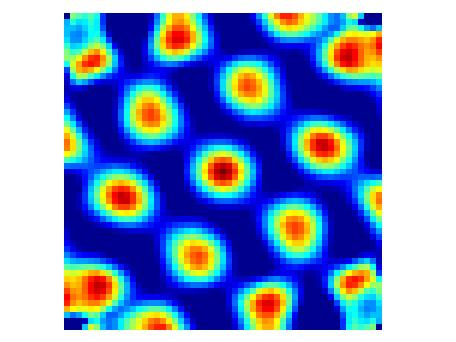
Spatial autocorrelogram of the neuronal activity of the grid cell from the first figure.

Grid cells are neurons that fire when a freely moving animal traverses a set of small regions (firing fields) which are roughly equal in size and arranged in a periodic triangular array that covers the entire available environment. Cells with this firing pattern have been found in all layers of the dorsocaudal medial entorhinal cortex (dMEC), but cells in different layers tend to differ in other respects. Layer II contains the largest density of pure grid cells, in the sense that they fire equally regardless of the direction in which an animal traverses a grid location. Grid cells from deeper layers are intermingled with conjunctive cells and head direction cells (i.e. in layers III, V and VI there are cells with a grid-like pattern that fire only when the animal is facing a particular direction).

Grid cells that lie next to one another (i.e., cells recorded from the same electrode) usually show the same grid spacing and orientation, but their grid vertices are displaced from one another by apparently random offsets. But cells recorded from separate electrodes at a distance from one another typically show different grid spacings. Cells located more ventrally (farther from the dorsal border of the MEC) generally have larger firing fields at each grid vertex, and correspondingly greater spacing between the grid vertices. The total range of grid spacings is not well established: the initial report described a roughly twofold range of grid spacings (from 39 cm to 73 cm) across the dorsalmost part (upper 25%) of the MEC, but there are indications of considerably larger grid scales in more ventral zones. Brun et al. (2008) recorded grid cells from multiple levels in rats running along an 18-meter track, and found that the grid spacing expanded from about 25 cm in their dorsalmost sites to about 3 m at the ventralmost sites. These recordings only extended 3/4 of the way to the ventral tip, so it is possible that even larger grids exist. Such multi-scale representations have been shown to be information theoretically desirable.

Grid-cell activity does not require visual input, since grid patterns remain unchanged when all the lights in an environment are turned off.

Grid-cell firing patterns are also reshaped by experience and by the geometry of the environment. Barry, Hayman, Burgess and Jeffery (2007) showed that grid scale and spacing rescale with the size of an enclosure when an animal is repeatedly tested in environments of different sizes, and a 2012 study by Barry, Ginzberg, O'Keefe and Burgess found that grids expand transiently when an animal encounters a novel environment, signalling environmental novelty. Geometric polarisation of the enclosure further perturbs the hexagonal symmetry of the pattern, suggesting that the grid is shaped by environmental geometry rather than imposed by a rigid internal template. But when visual cues are present they exert strong control over the alignment of the grids: rotating a cue card on the wall of a cylinder causes grid patterns to rotate by the same amount. Grid patterns appear on the first entrance of an animal into a novel environment, and then usually remain stable. When an animal is moved into a completely different environment, grid cells maintain their grid spacing, and the grids of neighboring cells maintain their relative offsets.

== Interactions with hippocampal place cells ==
When a rat is moved to a different environment, the spatial activity patterns of hippocampal place cells usually show "complete remapping"—that is, the pattern of place fields reorganizes in a way that bears no detectable resemblance to the pattern in the original environment. If the features of an environment are altered less radically, however, the place field pattern may show a lesser degree of change, referred to as "rate remapping", in which many cells alter their firing rates but the majority of cells retain place fields in the same locations as before. This was examined using simultaneous recordings of hippocampal and entorhinal cells, and found that in situations where the hippocampus shows rate remapping, grid cells show unaltered firing patterns, whereas when the hippocampus shows complete remapping, grid cell firing patterns show unpredictable shifts and rotations.

== Theta rhythmicity ==
Neural activity in nearly every part of the hippocampal system is modulated by the hippocampal theta rhythm, which has a frequency range of about 6–9 Hz in rats. The entorhinal cortex is no exception: like the hippocampus, it receives cholinergic and GABAergic input from the medial septal area, the central controller of theta. Grid cells, like hippocampal place cells, show strong theta modulation. Grid cells from layer II of the MEC also resemble hippocampal place cells in that they show phase precession—that is, their spike activity advances from late to early phases of the theta cycle as an animal passes through a grid vertex. A recent model of grid cell activity explained this phase precession by assuming the presence of 1-dimensional attractor network composed of stellate cells. Most grid cells from layer III do not precess, but their spike activity is largely confined to half of the theta cycle. The grid cell phase precession is not derived from the hippocampus, because it continues to appear in animals whose hippocampus has been inactivated by an agonist of GABA.

== Possible functions ==
Many species of mammals can keep track of spatial location even in the absence of visual, auditory, olfactory, or tactile cues, by integrating their movements—the ability to do this is referred to in the literature as path integration. A number of theoretical models have explored mechanisms by which path integration could be performed by neural networks. In most models, such as those of Samsonovich and McNaughton (1997) or Burak and Fiete (2009), the principal ingredients are (1) an internal representation of position, (2) internal representations of the speed and direction of movement, and (3) a mechanism for shifting the encoded position by the right amount when the animal moves. Because cells in the MEC encode information about position (grid cells) and movement (head direction cells and conjunctive position-by-direction cells), this area is currently viewed as the most promising candidate for the place in the brain where path integration occurs. However, the question remains unresolved, as in humans the entorhinal cortex does not appear to be required for path integration. Burak and Fiete (2009) showed that a computational simulation of the grid cell system was capable of performing path integration to a high level of accuracy. However, more recent theoretical work has suggested that grid cells might perform a more general denoising process not necessarily related to spatial processing.

Hafting et al. (2005) suggested that a place code is computed in the entorhinal cortex and fed into the hippocampus, which may make the associations between place and events that are needed for the formation of memories.

A hexagonal lattice.

In contrast to a hippocampal place cell, a grid cell has multiple firing fields, with regular spacing, which tessellate the environment in a hexagonal pattern. The unique properties of grid cells are as follows:

1. Grid cells have firing fields dispersed over the entire environment (in contrast to place fields which are restricted to certain specific regions of the environment)
2. The firing fields are organized into a hexagonal lattice
3. Firing fields are generally equally spaced apart, such that the distance from one firing field to all six adjacent firing fields is approximately the same (though when an environment is resized, the field spacing may shrink or expand differently in different directions; Barry et al. 2007)
4. Firing fields are equally positioned, such that the six neighboring fields are located at approximately 60 degree increments

The grid cells are anchored to external landmarks, but persist in darkness, suggesting that grid cells may be part of a self-motion–based map of the spatial environment.

In 2018, researchers at DeepMind working with Caswell Barry reported the first demonstration of grid-cell-like representations in artificial recurrent neural networks: when networks were trained to perform path integration, units with hexagonal spatial firing emerged spontaneously, and artificial agents equipped with these representations were able to plan more efficient routes than agents without them.

A convergent evolution analogy has been argued to exist between grid cells and the decomposition of images in JPEG compression into superimposed discrete cosine basis functions. According to this interpretation, the joint activity of all grid cells provides an optimal compression of an animal's topography. The result of this is that "grid cells and even same scale modules of grid cells do not function as isolated entities, but rather integrate their information across the many grid scales in order to form a unique compressed representation of the animal's spatial location."

== See also ==
- Boundary cell, discovered in 2008.
- List of distinct cell types in the adult human body
