= Place cell =

Place-activated hippocampus cells found in some mammals

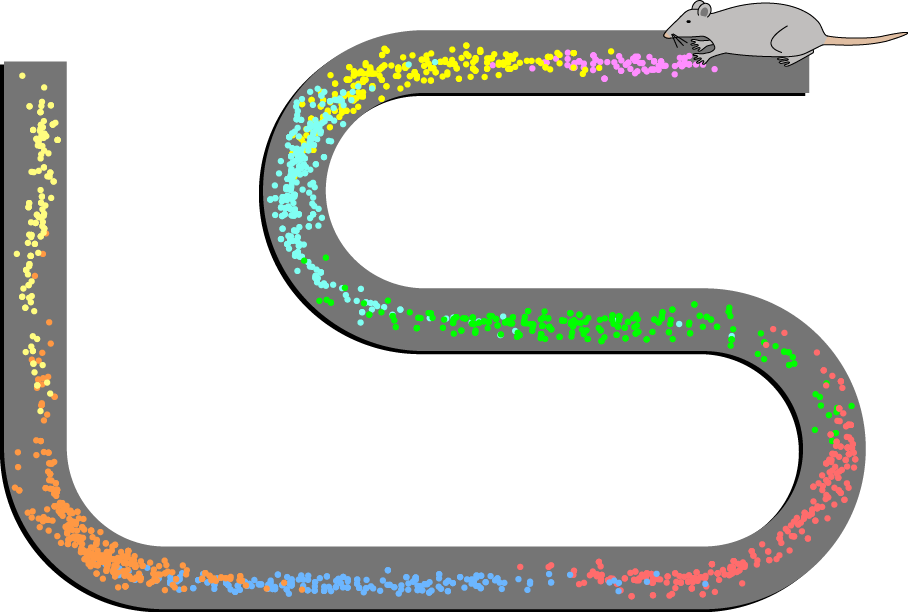
Spatial firing patterns of eight place cells recorded from the CA1 layer of a rat. The rat ran back and forth along an elevated track, stopping at each end to eat a small food reward. Dots indicate positions where action potentials were recorded, with color indicating which neuron emitted that action potential.

A place cell is a kind of pyramidal neuron in the hippocampus that becomes active when an animal enters a particular place in its environment, which is known as the place field. Place cells are thought to act collectively as a cognitive representation of a specific location in space, known as a cognitive map. Place cells work with other types of neurons in the hippocampus and surrounding regions to perform this kind of spatial processing. They have been found in a variety of animals, including rodents, bats, monkeys and humans.

Place-cell firing patterns are often determined by stimuli in the environment such as visual landmarks, and olfactory and vestibular stimuli. Place cells have the ability to suddenly change their firing pattern from one pattern to another, a phenomenon known as remapping. This remapping may occur in either some of the place cells or in all place cells at once. It may be caused by a number of changes, such as in the odor of the environment.

Place cells are thought to play an important role in episodic memory. They contain information about the spatial context a memory took place in. And they seem to perform consolidation by exhibiting replay – the reactivation of the place cells involved in a certain experience at a much faster timescale. Place cells show alterations with age and disease, such as Alzheimer's disease, which may be involved in a decrease of memory function.

The 2014 Nobel Prize in Physiology or Medicine was awarded to John O'Keefe for the discovery of place cells, and to Edvard and May-Britt Moser for the discovery of grid cells.

== Background ==
Place cells were first discovered by John O'Keefe and Jonathan Dostrovsky in 1971 in rats' hippocampuses. They noticed that rats with impairments in their hippocampus performed poorly in spatial tasks, and thus hypothesised that this area must hold some kind of spatial representation of the environment. To test this hypothesis, they developed chronic electrode implants, with which they could record the activity of individual cells extracellularly in the hippocampus. They noted that some of the cells showed activity when a rat was "situated in a particular part of the testing platform facing in a particular direction". These cells would later be called place cells.

This video shows a rat running around in a circular environment (black line) and any time a particular cell is active (red dots). The red dots cluster around one location, which is the place field of the cell.

In 1976, O'Keefe performed a follow-up study, demonstrating the presence of what they called place units. These units were cells that fired in a particular place in the environment, the place field. They are described as having a low resting firing rate (<1 Hz) when a rat is not in its place field, but a particularly high firing rate, which can be over 100 Hz in some cases, within the place field. Additionally, O'Keefe described six special cells, which he called misplace units, which also fire only in a particular place, but only when the rat performed an additional behaviour, such as sniffing, which was often correlated with the presence of a novel stimulus, or the absence of an expected stimulus. The findings ultimately supported the cognitive map theory, the idea that the hippocampus hold a spatial representation, a cognitive map of the environment.

There has been much debate as to whether hippocampal place cells function depends on landmarks in the environment, on environmental boundaries, or on an interaction between the two. Additionally, not all place cells rely on the same external cues. One important distinction in cues is local and distal, where local cues appear in the immediate vicinity of a subject, whereas distal cues are far away, and act more like landmarks. Individual place cells have been shown to follow either or rely on both. Additionally, the cues on which the place cells rely may depend on previous experience of the subject and the saliency of the cue.

There has also been much debate as to whether hippocampal pyramidal cells truly encode non-spatial information as well as spatial information. According to the cognitive map theory, the hippocampus's primary role is to store spatial information through place cells and the hippocampus was biologically designed to provide a subject with spatial information. Recent findings, such as a study showing that place cells respond to non-spatial dimensions, such as sound frequency, disagree with the cognitive map theory. Instead, they support a new theory saying that the hippocampus has a more general function encoding continuous variables, and location just happens to be one of those variables. This fits in with the idea that the hippocampus has a predictive function.

Grid cells and place cells work together to determine the position of the animal

=== Relationship to grid cells ===
It has been proposed that place cells are derivatives of grid cells, pyramidal cells in the entorhinal cortex. This theory suggests that the place fields of the place cells are a combination of several grid cells, which have hexagonal grid-like patterns of activity. The theory has been supported by computational models. The relation may arise through Hebbian learning. But grid cells may perform a more supporting role in the formation of place fields, such as path integration input. Empirical lesion studies indicate that inputs from the medial entorhinal cortex (MEC), where grid cells, head direction cells, and border cells reside, are not strictly required for hippocampal place fields to form. When the entire MEC is bilaterally ablated in rats, a subpopulation of hippocampal pyramidal cells continues to fire at normal rates and maintain place-selective firing. However, without MEC inputs, the surviving place fields are nearly twice as broad, carry substantially less spatial information, and exhibit reduced long-term stability. Behaviorally, this loss of spatial precision impairs rapid and flexible spatial navigation (such as learning a reconfigured water maze), even though other hippocampus-dependent spatial tasks like context fear conditioning and displaced object recognition remain intact. This suggests that while the hippocampus can generate rudimentary place fields from other pathways (such as the lateral entorhinal cortex), MEC grid and spatial inputs are essential for fine-tuning spatial precision, stabilizing cognitive maps over time, and supporting flexible place memory.(Hales et al., 2014) Another non-spatial explanation of hippocampal function suggests that the hippocampus performs clustering of inputs to produce representations of the current context – spatial or non-spatial.

Place cells are found in the hippocampus, a structure in the medial temporal lobe of the brain.

== Properties ==
=== Place fields ===
Place cells fire in a specific region of an environment, known as a place field. Place fields are roughly analogous to the receptive fields of sensory neurons, in that the firing region corresponds to a region of sensory information in the environment. However, unlike receptive fields, place cells show no topography, meaning that two neighboring cells do not necessarily have neighboring place fields. Place cells fire spikes in bursts at a high frequency inside the place field, but outside of the place field they remain relatively inactive. Place fields are allocentric, meaning that they are defined with respect to the outside world rather than the body. By orienting based on the environment rather than the individual, place fields can work effectively as neural maps of the environment. A typical place cell will have only one or a few place fields in a small laboratory environment. However, in larger environments, place cells have been shown to contain multiple place fields which are usually irregular. Place cells may also show directionality, meaning they will only fire in a certain location when travelling in a particular direction.

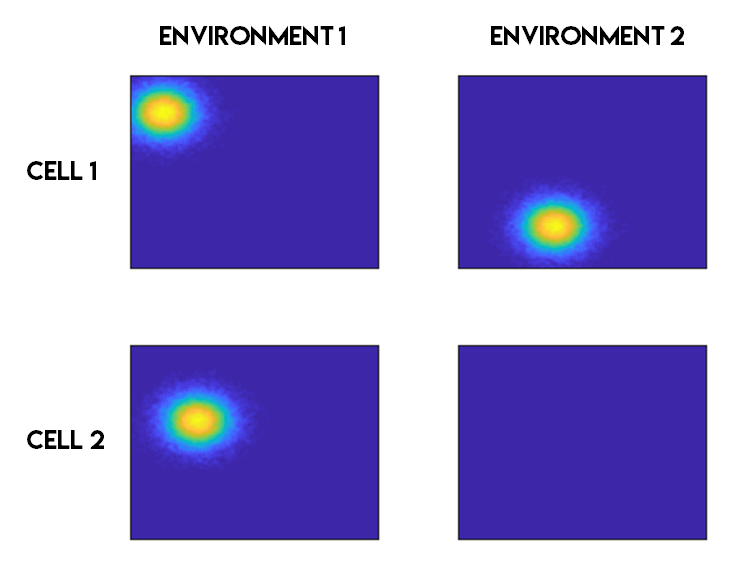
An example of place cell remapping, with the location of the place field of cell 1 changing between environment, and cell 2 losing its place field in environment 2.

=== Remapping ===
Remapping refers to the change in the place field characteristics that occurs when a subject experiences a new environment, or the same environment in a new context. This phenomenon was first reported in 1987, and is thought to play a role in the memory function of the hippocampus. There are broadly two types of remapping: global remapping and partial remapping. Experiments using in vivo calcium imaging in rats have shown that remapping of CA1 place-cell ensembles is more pronounced when animals learn to avoid a path associated with mild footshock than under conditions where the same shock does not lead to lasting avoidance, indicating that remapping is linked to whether an aversive event is stored in memory. Recent computational modeling work further suggests that a single hippocampal–entorhinal network architecture can generate place-cell–like and grid-cell–like activity patterns as well as concept-cell–like codes for semantic information, providing a unified account of how spatial and non-spatial context may be represented in these circuits. These findings and models are based mainly on rodent data and theoretical analysis, so their generality to human hippocampal coding remains an active topic of research.When global remapping occurs, most or all of the place cells remap, meaning they lose or gain a place field, or their place field changes its location. Partial remapping means that most place fields are unchanged and only a small portion of the place cells remap. Some of the changes to the environment that have been shown to induce remapping include changing the shape or size of the environment, the color of the walls, the smell in the environment, or the relevance of a location to the task at hand.

=== Phase precession ===
The firing of place cells is timed in relation to local theta waves, a process termed phase precession. Upon entering a place field, place cells will fire in bursts at a particular point in the phase of the underlying theta waves. However, as an animal progresses through the place field, the firing will happen progressively earlier in the phase. It is thought that this phenomenon increases the accuracy of the place coding, and aids in plasticity, which is required for learning.

=== Directionality ===
In some cases place cells show directionality, meaning they will only fire in a location when the subject is travelling in a particular direction. However, they may also be omnidirectional, meaning they fire regardless of the direction the subject. The lack of directionality in some place cells might occur particularly in impoverished environments, whereas in more complicated environments directionality is enhanced. The radial arm maze is one such environment where directionality does occur. In this environment, cells may even have multiple place fields, of which one is strongly directional, while the others are not. In virtual reality corridors, the degree of directionality in the population of place cells is particularly high. The directionality of place cells has been shown to emerge as a result of the animal's behaviour. For example, the receptive fields become skewed when rats travel a linear track in a single direction. Recent theoretical studies suggest that place cells encode a successor representation which maps the current state to the predicted successor states, and that directionality emerges from this formalism. This computational framework also provides an account for the distortion of place fields around obstacles.

=== Sensory input ===
Place cells were initially believed to fire in direct relation to simple sensory inputs, but studies have suggested that this may not be the case. Place fields are usually unaffected by large sensory changes, like removing a landmark from an environment, but respond to subtle changes, like a change in color or shape of an object. This suggests that place cells respond to complex stimuli rather than simple individual sensory cues. According to the functional differentation model, sensory information is processed in various cortical structures upstream of the hippocampus before actually reaching the structure, so that the information received by place cells is a compilation, a functional derivative, of different stimuli.

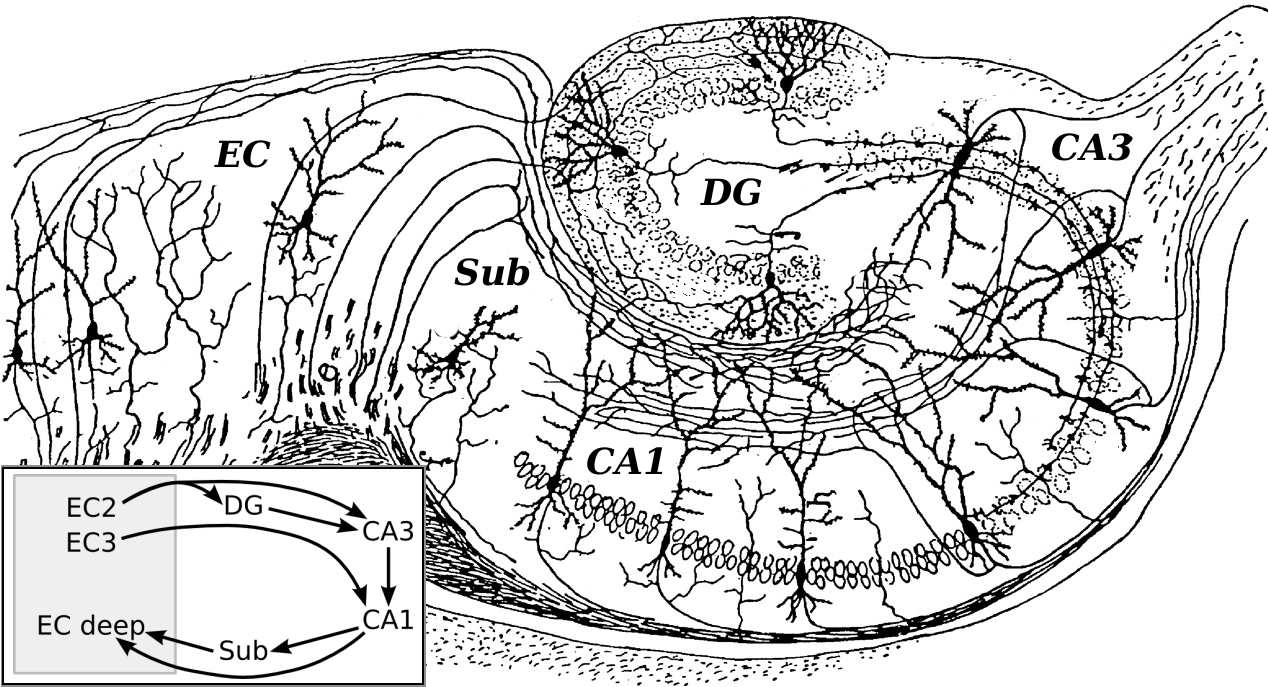
Anatomy of the hippocampal formation, including the entorhinal cortex (EC), the dentate gyrus (DG) and the different hippocampal subfields (CA1 and CA3). Inset shows the wiring between these different areas.

Sensory information received by place cells can be categorized as either metric or contextual information, where metric information corresponds to where place cells should fire and contextual input corresponds to whether or not a place field should fire in a certain environment. Metric sensory information is any kind of spatial input that might indicate a distance between two points. For example, the edges of an environment might signal the size of the overall place field or the distance between two points within a place field. Metric signals can be either linear or directional. Directional inputs provide information about the orientation of a place field, whereas linear inputs essentially form a representational grid. Contextual cues allow established place fields to adapt to minor changes in the environment, such as a change in object color or shape. Metric and contextual inputs are processed together in the entorhinal cortex before reaching the hippocampal place cells. Visuospatial and olfactory inputs are examples of sensory inputs that are utilized by place cells. These types of sensory cues can include both metric and contextual information.

==== Visuospatial inputs ====
Spatial cues such as geometric boundaries or orienting landmarks are important examples of metric input. An example is the walls of an environment, which provides information about relative distance and location. Place cells generally rely on set distal cues rather than cues in the immediate proximal environment, though local cues can have a profound impact on local place fields. Visual sensory inputs can also supply important contextual information. A change in color of a specific object or the walls of the environment can affect whether or not a place cell fires in a particular field. Thus, visuospatial sensory information is critical to the formation and recollection of place field.

==== Olfactory inputs ====
Although place cells primarily rely on visuospatial input, some studies suggest that olfactory input may also affect the formation and stability of place fields. Olfaction may compensate for a loss of visual information, or even be responsible for the formation of stable place fields in the same way visuospatial cues are. This has been confirmed by a study in a virtual environment that was composed of odor gradients. Change in the olfactory stimulus in an environment may also cause the remapping of place cells.

==== Vestibular inputs ====
Stimuli from the vestibular system, such as rotations, can cause changes in place cells firing. After receiving vestibular input some place cells may remap to align with this input, though not all cells will remap and are more reliant on visual cues. Bilateral lesions of the vestibular system in patients may cause abnormal firing of hippocampal place cells as evidenced, in part, by difficulties with spatial tasks such as the radial arm maze and the Morris water navigation task.

==== Movement inputs ====
Grid and place cells contribute to path integration, a process which sums the vectors of distance and direction travelled from a start point to estimate current position.

Movement can also be an important spatial cue. Mice use their self-motion information to determine how far and in which direction they have travelled, a process called path integration. This is especially the case in the absence of continuous sensory inputs. For example, in an environment with a lack of visuospatial inputs, an animal might search for the environment edge using touch, and discern location based on the distance of its movement from that edge. Path integration is largely aided by grid cells, which are a type of neuron in the entorhinal cortex that relay information to place cells in the hippocampus. Grid cells establish a grid representation of a location, so that during movement place cells can fire according to their new location while orienting according to the reference grid of their external environment.

== Episodic memory ==
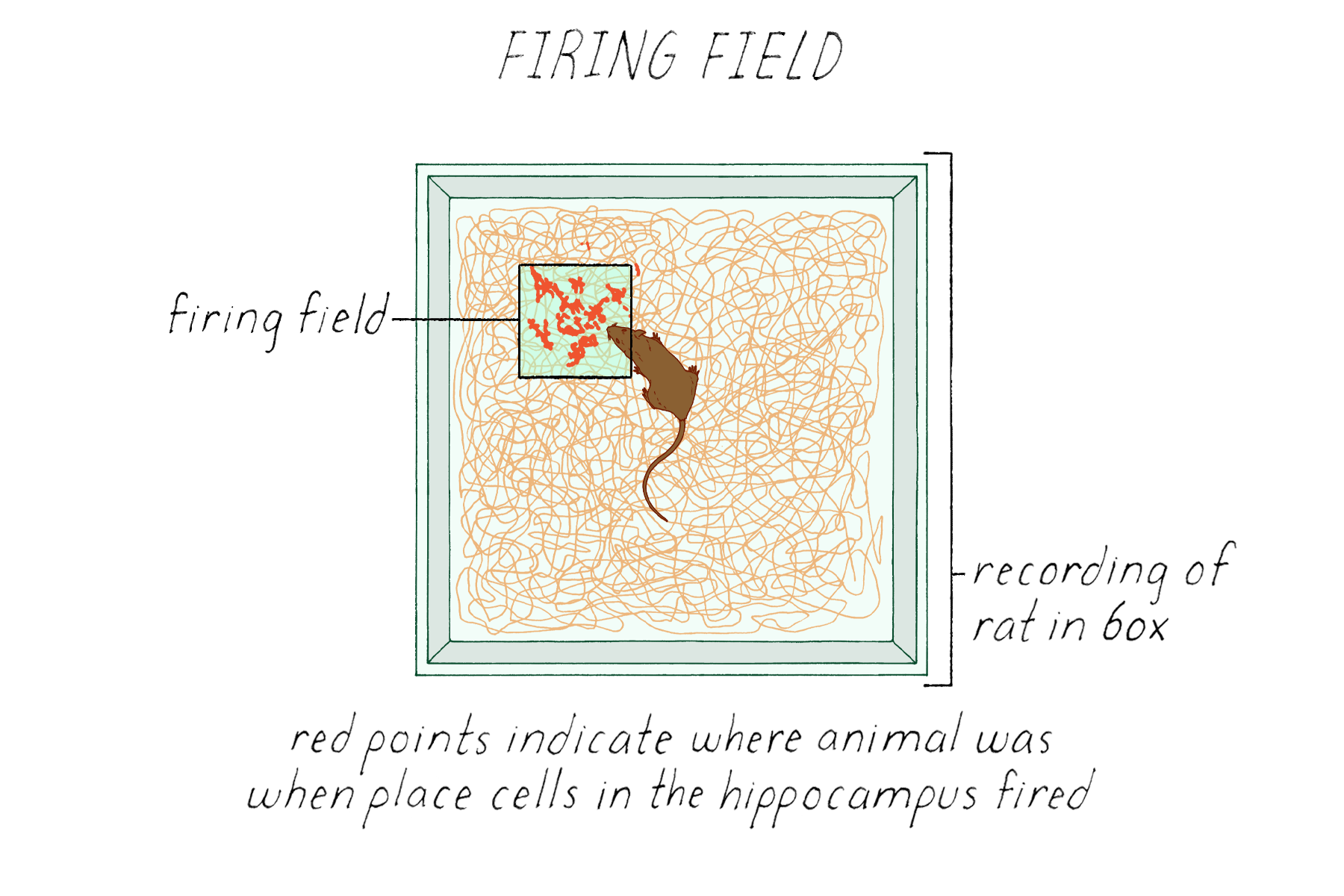
The firing field is a specific location in the external environment where a spatial coding neuron (place cells, grid cells, etc.) becomes active.

Place cells play an important role in episodic memory. One important aspect of episodic memory is the spatial context in which the event occurred. Hippocampal place cells have stable firing patterns even when cues from a location are removed and specific place fields begin firing when exposed to signals or a subset of signals from a previous location. This suggests that place cells provide the spatial context for a memory by recalling the neural representation of the environment in which the memory occurred. By establishing spatial context, place cells play a role in completing memory patterns. Furthermore, place cells are able to maintain a spatial representation of one location while recalling the neural map of a separate location, effectively differentiating between present experience and past memory. Place cells are therefore considered to demonstrate both pattern completion and pattern separation qualities.

=== Pattern completion ===
Pattern completion is the ability to recall an entire memory from a partial or degraded sensory cue. Place cells are able to maintain a stable firing field even after significant signals are removed from a location, suggesting that they can recall a pattern based on only part of the original input. Furthermore, the pattern completion exhibited by place cells is symmetric, because an entire memory can be retrieved from any part of it. For example, in an object-place association memory, spatial context can be used to recall an object and the object can be used to recall the spatial context.

=== Pattern separation ===
Pattern separation is the ability to differentiate one memory from other stored memories. Pattern separation begins in the dentate gyrus, a section of the hippocampus involved in memory formation and retrieval. Granule cells in the dentate gyrus process sensory information using competitive learning, and relay a preliminary representation to form place fields. Place fields are extremely specific, as they are capable of remapping and adjusting firing rates in response to subtle sensory signal changes. This specificity is critical for pattern separation, as it distinguishes memories from one another.

=== Reactivation, replay, and preplay ===
Place cells often exhibit reactivation outside their place fields. This reactivation has a much faster time scale than the actual experience, and it occurs mostly in the same order in which it was originally experienced, or, more rarely, in reverse. Replay is believed to have a functional role in memory retrieval and memory consolidation. However, when replay is disturbed, it does not necessarily affect place coding, which means it is not essentially for consolidation in all circumstances. The same sequence of activity may occur before the actual experience. This phenomenon, termed preplay, may have a role in prediction and learning.

== Model animals ==
Place cells were first discovered in rats, but place cells and place-like cells have since been found in a number of different animals, including rodents, bats and primates. Additionally, evidence for place cells in humans was found in 2003.

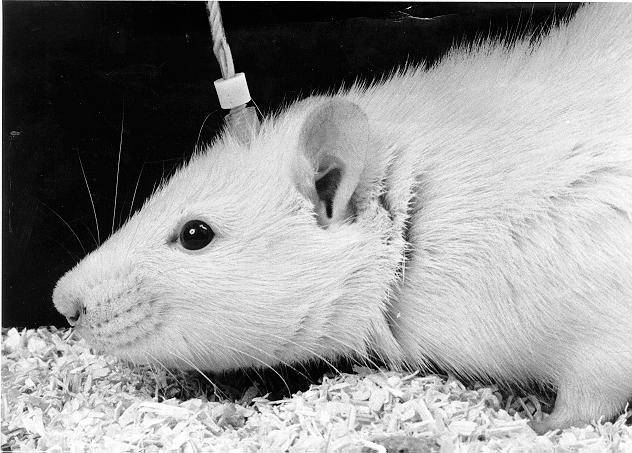
A rat with an electrode implanted

=== Rodents ===
Both rats and mice are often used as model animals for place cells research. Rats became especially popular after the development of multiarray electrodes, which allows for the simultaneous recording of a large number of cells. However, mice have the advantage that a larger range of genetic variants are available. Additionally mice can be headfixed, allowing for the use of microscopy techniques to look directly into the brain. Though rats and mice have similar place cells dynamics, mice have smaller place cells, and on the same size track have an increase in number of place fields per cell. Additionally, their replay is weaker compared to the replay in rats. Studies indicate that in rodents, all hippocampal pyramidal cells appear to be place cells.

In addition to rats and mice, place cells have also been found in chinchillas.

Rats furthermore have social place cells, cells which encode the position of other rats. This finding was published in Science at the same time as the report of social place cells in bats.

=== Bats ===
Place cells were reported in Egyptian fruit bats for the first time in 2007 by Nachum Ulanovsky and his lab. The place cells in bats have a place field in 3D, which is probably due to the bat flying in three dimensions. The place cells in bats can be based on either vision or echolocation, which remapping taking place when bats switch between the two. Bats also have social place cells; this finding was published in Science at the same time as the report of social place cells in rats.

=== Primates ===
Place-related responses have been found in cells of the Japanese macaque and common marmoset, however, whether these are true place cells or spatial view cells is still debated. Spatial view cells respond to locations that are visually explored by eye movement, or the "view of a space", rather than the location of the monkey's body. In the macaque, cells were recorded while the monkey was driving a motorised cab around the experimental room. Additionally, place-related responses have been found macaques while they navigated in a virtual reality. More recently, place cells may have been identified in the hippocampus of freely moving macaques and marmosets.

== Disturbances to place cell function ==
=== Effects of alcohol ===
Place cell firing rate decreases dramatically after ethanol exposure, causing reduced spatial sensitivity, which has been hypothesised to be the cause of impairments in spatial procession after alcohol exposure.

=== Alzheimer's disease ===
Problems with spatial memory and navigation are thought to be one of the early indications of Alzheimer's disease. Place cells have been shown to degenerate in Alzheimer's mouse models, which causes such problems with spatial memory in these mice. Furthermore, the place cells in these models have unstable representations of space, and cannot learn stable representations for new environments as well as place cells in healthy mice. The hippocampal theta waves, as well as the gamma waves, that influence place cell firing, for example through phase precession, are also affected.

=== Aging ===
Place field properties, including the rate of firing and spike characteristics such as width and amplitude of the spikes, are largely similar between young and aged rats in the CA1 hippocampal region. However, while the size of place fields in the hippocampal CA3 region remains the same between young and aged rats, average firing rate in this region is higher in aged rats. Young rats exhibit place field plasticity: when they are moving along a straight path, place fields are activated one after another. When young rats repeatedly traverse the same straight path, connection between place fields are strengthened due to plasticity, causing subsequent place fields to fire more quickly and causing place field expansion, possibly aiding young rats in spatial memory and learning. However, this observed place field expansion and plasticity is decreased in aged rat subjects, possibly reducing their capacity for spatial learning and memory.

This plasticity can be rescued in aged rats by giving them memantine, an antagonist that blocks the NMDA receptors which is known to improve spatial memory, and was therefore used in an attempt to restore place field plasticity in aged subjects. NMDA receptors, which are glutamate receptors, exhibit decreased activity in aged subjects. The application of memantine leads to in increase in place field plasticity in aged rat subjects. Although memantine aids in the encoding process of spatial information in aged rat subjects, it does not help with the retrieval of this information later in time.

Aged rats further show a high instability in their place cells in the CA1 region. When introduced to the same environment several times, the hippocampal map of the environment changed about 30% of the time, suggesting that the place cells are remapping in response to the exact same environment. Contrarily, the CA3 place cells are show increased plasticity in aged subjects. The same place fields in the CA3 region to activate in similar environments, whereas different place fields in young rats would fire in similar environments because they would pick up on subtle differences in these environments. One possible cause of these changes in plasticity may be increased reliance on self-motion cues.

== See also ==
- Spatial view cells, primate hippocampal counterpart for visual field.
- Grid cells
- Head direction cells
- List of distinct cell types in the adult human body
