= Head direction cell =

Type of neuron involved in spatial processing

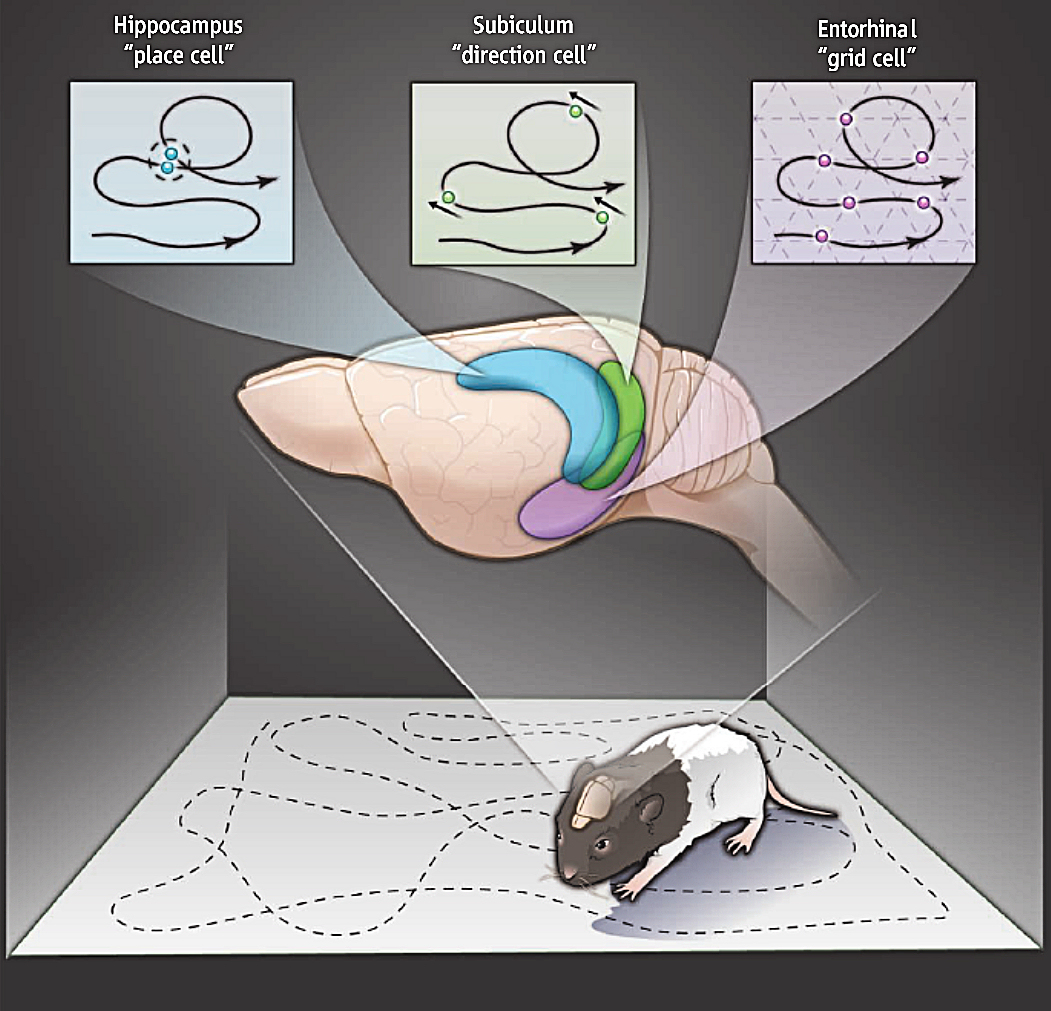
Rat pup exploring new environment

Head direction (HD) cells are neurons found in a number of brain regions that increase their firing rates above baseline levels only when the animal's head points in a specific direction. They have been reported in rats, monkeys, mice, chinchillas and bats, but are thought to be common to all mammals, perhaps all vertebrates and perhaps even some invertebrates, and to underlie the "sense of direction". When the animal's head is facing in the cell's "preferred firing direction" these neurons fire at a steady rate (i.e., they do not show adaptation), but firing decreases back to baseline rates as the animal's head turns away from the preferred direction (usually about 45° away from this direction).

HD cells are found in many brain areas, including the cortical regions of postsubiculum (also known as the dorsal presubiculum), retrosplenial cortex, and entorhinal cortex, and subcortical regions including the thalamus (the anterior dorsal and the lateral dorsal thalamic nuclei), lateral mammillary nucleus, dorsal tegmental nucleus and striatum. It is thought that the cortical head direction cells process information about the environment, while the subcortical ones process information about angular head movements.

A striking characteristic of HD cells is that in most brain regions they maintain the same relative preferred firing directions, even if the animal is moved to a different room, or if landmarks are moved. This has suggested that the cells interact so as to maintain a unitary stable heading signal (see "Theoretical models"). Recently, however, a subpopulation of HD neurons has been found in the dysgranular part of retrosplenial cortex that can operate independently of the rest of the network, and which seems more responsive to environmental cues.

The system is related to the place cell system, located in the hippocampus, which is mostly orientation-invariant and location-specific, whereas HD cells are mostly orientation-specific and location-invariant. However, HD cells do not require a functional hippocampus to express their head direction specificity. They depend on the vestibular system, and the firing is independent of the position of the animal's body relative to its head.

Some HD cells exhibit anticipatory behaviour: the best match between HD activity and the animal's actual head direction has been found to be up to 95 ms in future. That is, activity of head direction cells predicts, 95 ms in advance, what the animal's head direction will be. This possibly reflects inputs from the motor system ("motor efference copy") preparing the network for an impending head turn.

HD cells continue to fire in an organized manner during sleep, as if animals were awake. However, instead of always pointing toward the same direction—the animals are asleep and thus immobile—the neuronal "compass needle" moves constantly. In particular, during rapid eye movement sleep, a brain state rich in dreaming activity in humans and whose electrical activity is virtually indistinguishable from the waking brain, this directional signal moves as if the animal is awake: that is, HD neurons are sequentially activated, and the individual neurons representing a common direction during wake are still active, or silent, at the same time.

== Vestibular influences ==
The HD network makes use of inertial and other movement-related inputs, and thus continues to operate even in the absence of light. These inertial properties are dependent on the vestibular system, especially the semicircular canals of the inner ear, which signal rotations of the head. The HD system integrates the vestibular output to maintain a signal reflecting cumulative rotation. The integration is less than perfect, though, especially for slow head rotations. If an animal is placed on an isolated platform and slowly rotated in the dark, the alignment of the HD system usually shifts a little bit for each rotation. If an animal explores a dark environment with no directional cues, the HD alignment tends to drift slowly and randomly over time.

== Visual and other sensory influences ==
One of the most interesting aspects of head direction cells is that their firing is not fully determined by sensory features of the environment. When an animal comes into a novel environment for the first time, the alignment of the head direction system is arbitrary. Over the first few minutes of exploration, the animal learns to associate the landmarks in the environment with directions. When the animal comes back into the same environment at a later time, if the head direction system is misaligned, the learned associations serve to realign it.

It is possible to temporarily disrupt the alignment of the HD system, for example by turning out the lights for a few minutes. Even in the dark, the HD system continues to operate, but its alignment to the environment may gradually drift. When the lights are turned back on and the animal can once more see landmarks, the HD system usually comes rapidly back into the normal alignment. Occasionally the realignment is delayed: the HD cells may maintain an abnormal alignment for as long as a few minutes, but then abruptly snap back. Consistent with the drifting in the dark, HD cells are not sensitive to the polarity of geomagnetic fields.

If these sorts of misalignment experiments are done too often, the system may break down. If an animal is repeatedly disoriented, and then placed into an environment for a few minutes each time, the landmarks gradually lose their ability to control the HD system, and eventually, the system goes into a state where it shows a different, and random, alignment on each trial.

There is evidence that the visual control of HD cells is mediated by the postsubiculum. Lesions of the postsubiculum do not eliminate thalamic HD cells, but they often cause the directionality to drift over time, even when there are plenty of visual cues. Thus, HD cells in postsubiculum-lesioned animals behave like HD cells in intact animals in the absence of light. Also, only a minority of cells recorded in the postsubiculum are HD cells, and many of the others show visual responses. In familiar environments, HD cells show consistent preferred directions across time as long as there is a polarizing cue of some sort that allows directions to be identified (in a cylinder with unmarked walls and no cues in the distance, preferred directions may drift over time).

== Theoretical models ==
The properties of the head direction system - particularly its persistence in the dark, and also the constant relationship of firing directions between cells regardless of environmental changes - suggested to early theoreticians the still-accepted notion that the cells might be organized in the form of a ring attractor, including simultaneously proposed models by Zhang and by Redish and Touretzky. In these models, which are a type of attractor network with pairs of cells representing nearby directions being more strongly coupled than pairs of cells representing distant orientations. With global inhibition, these interactions cause activity to stabilize, such that a representation of a single orientation is more stable than states representing multiple incoherent orientations. Thus, these cells can be conceptualized as forming an imaginary ring, with each cell exciting cells coding for its own or neighboring directions, and suppressing cells coding for other directions. A key insight provided by these models was that the topology of the orientation selectivity (the ring) came from internal connections, while external cues were associated with those internal representations. Thus head direction cells, like place cells, were not simple sensory responses. In these models and their subsequent versions, information about changes in the animal's orientation provided by vestibular and visual motion signals were provided by off-shifted connections, while information from distal cues were provided by learned input connections. Direct evidence for such an organization in insects was recently reported: in mammals it is assumed that the "ring" is distributed, and not a geometric anatomical form. While direct anatomical evidence for such excitatory interconnections between head direction cells is lacking, several predictions from the models have been confirmed, such as how the tuning curves would change during left and right rotations, self-coherent representations during sleep, and changes during drift and reorientation.

An alternative model has also been proposed by Song and Wang, in which the same attractor mechanism could be implemented with inhibitory interconnections instead. More complex connection matrices that can produce mathematically equivalent systems have also been proposed, but evidence for these alternate models is lacking.

== History ==
Head direction cells were discovered by James B. Ranck, Jr., in the rat dorsal presubiculum, a structure that lies near the hippocampus on the dorsocaudal brain surface. Ranck reported his discovery in a Society for Neuroscience abstract in 1984. Jeffrey Taube, a postdoctoral fellow working in Ranck's laboratory, made these cells the subject of his research. Taube, Ranck and Bob Muller summarized their findings in a pair of papers in the Journal of Neuroscience in 1990. These seminal papers served as the foundation for all of the work that has been done subsequently. Taube, after taking a position at Dartmouth College, has devoted his career to the study of head direction cells, and been responsible for a number of the most important discoveries, as well as writing several key review papers.

The postsubiculum has numerous anatomical connections. Tracing these connections led to the discovery of head direction cells in other parts of the brain. In 1993, Mizumori and Williams reported finding HD cells in a small region of the rat thalamus called the lateral dorsal nucleus. Two years later, Taube found HD cells in the nearby anterior thalamic nuclei. Chen et al. found limited numbers of HD cells in posterior parts of the neocortex. The observation in 1998 of HD cells in the lateral mammillary area of the hypothalamus completed an interesting pattern: the parahippocampus, mammillary nuclei, anterior thalamus, and retrosplenial cortex are all elements in a neural loop called the Papez circuit, proposed by Walter Papez in 1939 as the neural substrate of emotion. Limited numbers of robust HD cells have also been observed in the hippocampus and dorsal striatum. Recently, substantial numbers of HD cells have been found in the medial entorhinal cortex, intermingled with spatially tuned grid cells.

The remarkable properties of HD cells, most particularly their conceptual simplicity and their ability to maintain firing when visual cues were removed or perturbed, led to considerable interest from theoretical neuroscientists. Several mathematical models were developed, which differed on details but had in common a dependence on mutually excitatory feedback to sustain activity patterns: a type of working memory, as it were.

HD cells have been described in many different animal species, including rats, mice, non human primates and bats. In bats, the HD system is three dimensional, and not only along the horizontal plane as in rodents. An HD-like neuronal network is also present in the drosophila, in which the HD cells are anatomically arranged along a ring.

== See also ==
- Spatial view cells, primate hippocampal counterpart for visual field.
- List of distinct cell types in the adult human body
