= Hippocampus anatomy =

Component of brain anatomy

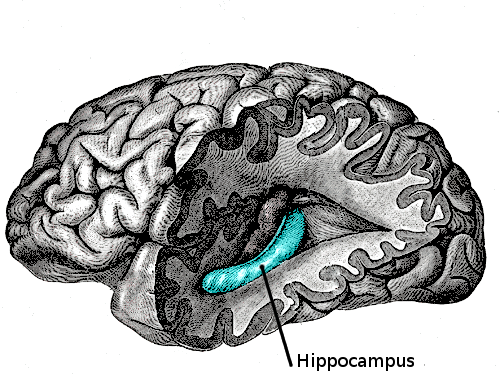
Hippocampus in the human brain

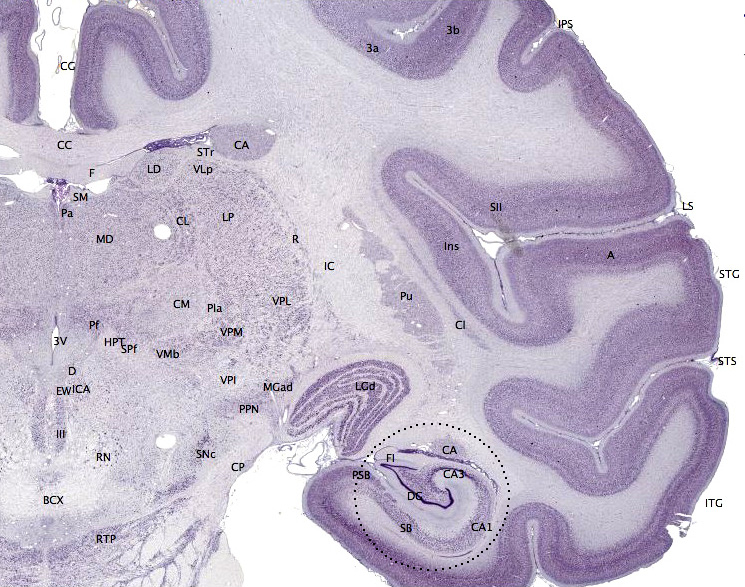
Nissl-stained coronal section of the brain of a macaque monkey, showing hippocampal formation and subfields (circled)

Hippocampus anatomy describes the physical aspects and properties of the hippocampus, a neural structure in the medial temporal lobe of each cerebral hemisphere of the brain. It has a distinctive, curved shape that has been likened to the sea-horse creature of Greek mythology, and the ram's horns of Amun in Egyptian mythology. The general layout holds across the full range of mammals, although the details vary. For example, in the rat, the two hippocampi look similar to a pair of bananas, joined at the stems. In humans and other primates, the portion of the hippocampus near the base of the temporal lobe is much broader than the part at the top. Due to the three-dimensional curvature of the hippocampus, two-dimensional sections are commonly presented. Neuroimaging can show a number of different shapes, depending on the angle and location of the cut.

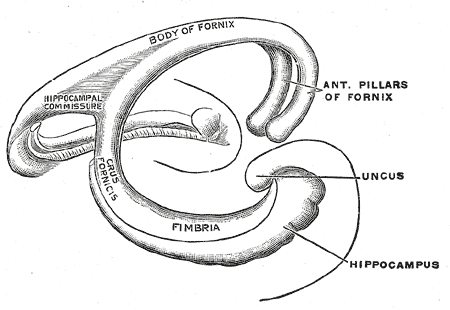
Shape of human hippocampus and associated structures

Cortical parts from the temporal lobe, parietal lobe, and the frontal lobe that surround the corpus callosum were treated as a surrounding border at the medial faces of the hemispheres where the brainstem is attached to the midbrain. The border (Latin limbus = border) was named the limbic lobe by Paul Broca. The limbic lobe is the main part of the limbic system. The hippocampus lines the posterior edge of the lobe. Other limbic structures include the cingulate cortex, the olfactory cortex, and the amygdala.

== Structure ==
The hippocampus is a five centimetre long ridge of gray matter tissue within the parahippocampal gyrus that can only be seen when the gyrus is opened up. The hippocampus is described in three regions, a head, body, and tail. The head is the expanded part near to the temporal lobe. The structure was named the hippocampus after its resemblance to a seahorse. Its general structural layout is similar across the species.

Cut in cross section, the hippocampus is C-shaped resembling a ram's horn. This led to its description of cornu ammonis meaning Amun's horn, whose initials were used to name the subfields CA1-CA4 that make up the structure of the hippocampus. Its curved layers are of different cell densities and varying degrees of axons in the subfields.

== Basic hippocampal circuit ==
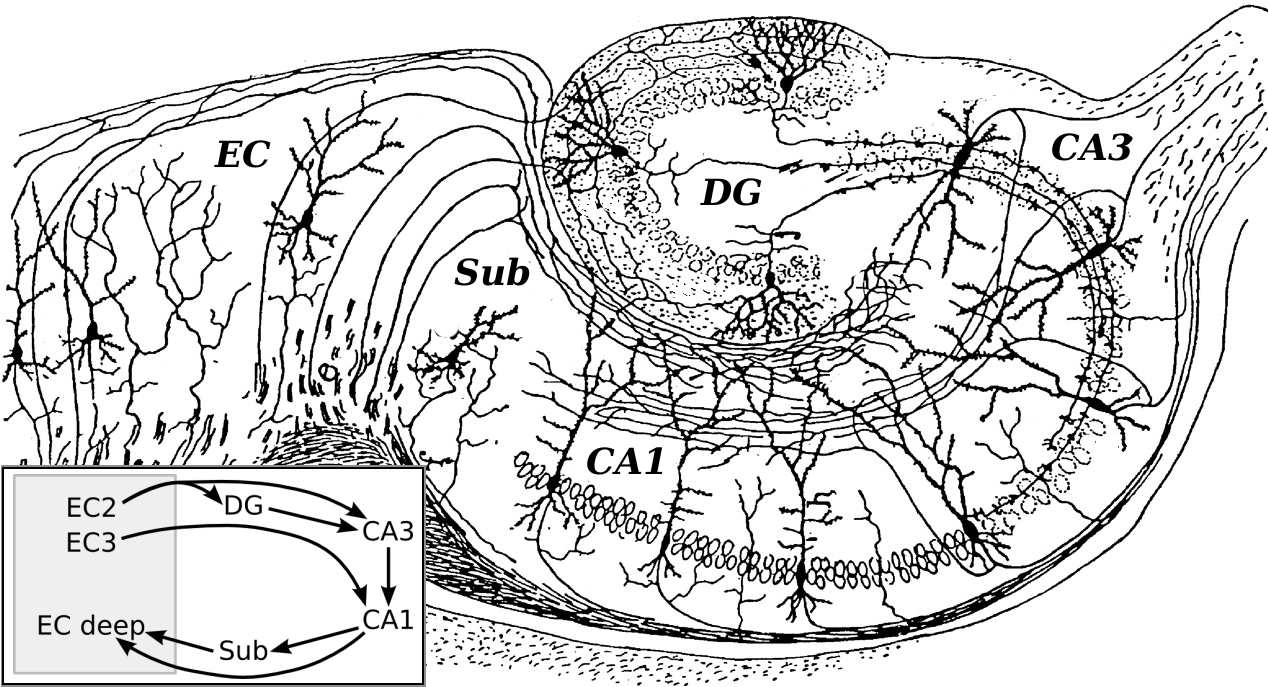
Basic circuit of the hippocampus, shown using a modified drawing by Ramon y Cajal. DG: dentate gyrus. Sub: subiculum. EC: entorhinal cortex

Starting at the dentate gyrus and working inward along the S-curve of the hippocampus means traversing a series of narrow zones. The first of these, the dentate gyrus (DG), is actually a separate structure, a tightly packed layer of small granule cells wrapped around the end of the hippocampus proper, forming a pointed wedge in some cross-sections, a semicircle in others. Next come a series of Cornu Ammonis areas: first CA4 (which underlies the dentate gyrus), then CA3, then a very small zone called CA2, then CA1. The CA areas are all filled with densely packed pyramidal cells similar to those found in the neocortex. After CA1 comes an area called the subiculum. After this comes a pair of ill-defined areas called the presubiculum and parasubiculum, then a transition to the cortex proper (mostly the entorhinal area of the cortex). Most anatomists use the term "hippocampus proper" to refer to the four CA fields, and hippocampal formation to refer to the hippocampus proper plus dentate gyrus and subiculum.

The major signaling pathways flow through the hippocampus and combine to form a loop. Most external input comes from the adjoining entorhinal cortex, via the axons of the so-called perforant path. These axons arise from layer 2 of the entorhinal cortex (EC), and terminate in the dentate gyrus and CA3. There is also a distinct pathway from layer 3 of the EC directly to CA1, often referred to as the temporoammonic or TA-CA1 pathway. Granule cells of the DG send their axons (called "mossy fibers") to CA3. Pyramidal cells of CA3 send their axons to CA1. Pyramidal cells of CA1 send their axons to the subiculum and deep layers of the EC. Subicular neurons send their axons mainly to the EC. The perforant path-to-dentate gyrus-to-CA3-to-CA1 was called the trisynaptic circuit by Per Andersen, who noted that thin slices could be cut out of the hippocampus perpendicular to its long axis, in a way that preserves all of these connections. This observation was the basis of his lamellar hypothesis, which proposed that the hippocampus can be thought of as a series of parallel strips, operating in a functionally independent way. The lamellar concept is still sometimes considered to be a useful organizing principle, but more recent data, showing extensive longitudinal connections within the hippocampal system, have required it to be substantially modified.

Perforant path input from EC layer II enters the dentate gyrus and is relayed to region CA3 (and to mossy cells, located in the hilus of the dentate gyrus, which then send information to distant portions of the dentate gyrus where the cycle is repeated). Region CA3 combines this input with signals from EC layer II and sends extensive connections within the region and also sends connections to strata radiatum and oriens of ipsilateral and contralateral CA1 regions through a set of fibers called the Schaffer collaterals, and commissural pathway, respectively. Region CA1 receives input from the CA3 subfield, EC layer III and the nucleus reuniens of the thalamus (which project only to the terminal apical dendritic tufts in the stratum lacunosum-moleculare). In turn, CA1 projects to the subiculum as well as sending information along the aforementioned output paths of the hippocampus. The subiculum is the final stage in the pathway, combining information from the CA1 projection and EC layer III to also send information along the output pathways of the hippocampus.

The hippocampus also receives a number of subcortical inputs. In Macaca fascicularis, these inputs include the amygdala (specifically the anterior amygdaloid area, the basolateral nucleus, and the periamygdaloid cortex), the medial septum and the diagonal band of Broca, the claustrum, the substantia innominata and the basal nucleus of Meynert, the thalamus (including the anterior nuclear complex, the laterodorsal nucleus, the paraventricular nucleus, and paratenial nucleus, the nucleus reuniens, and the nucleus centralis medialis), the lateral preoptic and lateral hypothalamic areas, the supramammillary and retromammillary regions, the ventral tegmental area, the tegmental reticular fields, the raphe nuclei (the nucleus centralis superior and the dorsal raphe nucleus), the nucleus reticularis tegementi pontis, the periaqueductal gray, the dorsal tegmental nucleus, and the locus coeruleus. The hippocampus also receives direct monosynaptic projections from the cerebellar fastigial nucleus.

== Major fiber systems in the rat ==
=== Angular bundle ===
These fibers start from the ventral part of entorhinal cortex (EC) and contain commissural (EC◀▶Hippocampus) and Perforant path (excitatory EC▶CA1, and inhibitory EC◀▶CA2) fibers. They travel along the septotemporal axis of the hippocampus. Perforant path fibers, as the name suggests, perforate subiculum before going to the hippocampus (CA fields) and dentate gyrus.

=== Fimbria-fornix pathway ===
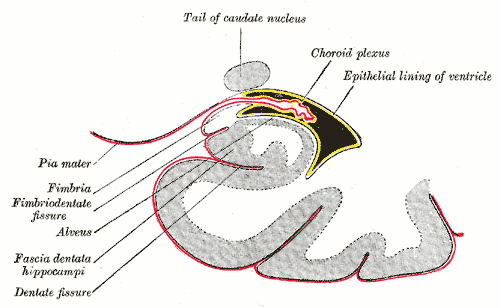
Coronal section of inferior horn of lateral ventricle. Fimbria labeled at center left and alveus to the right.

Fimbria-fornix fibers are the hippocampal and subicular gateway to and from subcortical brain regions. Different parts of this system are given different names:

- White myelinated fibers that cover the ventricular (deep) parts of hippocampus make alveus.
- Fibers that cover the temporal parts of hippocampus make a fiber bundle that is called fimbria. Going from temporal to septal (dorsal) parts of hippocampus fimbria collects more and more hippocampal and subicular outputs and becomes thicker.
- In the midline and under the corpus callosum, these fibers form the fornix.

At the circuit level, the alveus contains axonal fibers from the DG and from pyramidal neurons of CA3, CA2, CA1 and the subiculum (CA1 ▶ subiculum and CA1 ▶ entorhinal projections) that collect in the temporal hippocampus to form the fimbria/fornix, one of the major outputs of the hippocampus. In the rat, some medial and lateral entorhinal axons (entorhinal ▶ CA1 projection) pass through alveus towards the CA1 stratum lacunosum moleculare without making a significant number of en passant boutons on other CA1 layers (Temporoammonic alvear pathway). Contralateral entorhinal ▶ CA1 projections almost exclusively pass through alveus. The more septal the more ipsilateral entorhinal-CA1 projections that take alvear pathway (instead of perforant path). Although subiculum sends axonal projections to alveus, subiculum ▶ CA1 projection passes through strata oriens and moleculare of subiculum and CA1. Cholinergic and GABAergic projections from MS-DBB to CA1 also pass through the fimbria. Fimbria stimulation leads to cholinergic excitation of CA1 oriens-lacunosum-moleculare (OLM) cells.

It is also known that extracellular stimulation of fimbria stimulates CA3 pyramidal cells antidromically and orthodromically, but it has no impact on dentate granule cells. Each CA1 pyramidal cell also sends an axonal branch to fimbria.

=== Hippocampal commissures ===
Hilar mossy cells and CA3 Pyramidal cells are the main origins of hippocampal commissural fibers. They pass through hippocampal commissures to reach contralateral regions of hippocampus. Hippocampal commissures have dorsal and ventral segments. Dorsal commissural fibers consists mainly of entorhinal and presubicular fibers to or from the hippocampus and dentate gyrus. As a rule of thumb, one could say that each cytoarchitectonic field that contributes to the commissural projection also has a parallel associational fiber that terminates in the ipsilateral hippocampus. The inner molecular layer of dentate gyrus (dendrites of both granule cells and GABAergic interneurons) receives a projection that has both associational and commissural fibers mainly from hilar mossy cells and to some extent from CA3c Pyramidal cells. Because this projection fibers originate from both ipsilateral and contralateral sides of hippocampus they are called associational/commissural projections. In fact, each mossy cell innervates both the ipsilateral and contralateral dentate gyrus. The well known trisynaptic circuit of the hippocampus spans mainly horizontally along the hippocampus. However, associational/commissural fibers, like CA2 Pyramidal cell associational projections, span mainly longitudinally (dorsoventrally) along the hippocampus. Commissural fibers that originate from CA3 Pyramidal cells go to CA3, CA2 and CA1 regions. Like mossy cells, a single CA3 Pyramidal cell contributes to both commissural and associational fibers, and they terminate on both principal cells and interneurons. A weak commissural projection connects both CA1 regions together. Subiculum has no commissural inputs or outputs. In comparison with rodents, hippocampal commissural connections are much less abundant in the monkey and humans. Although excitatory cells are the main contributors to commissural pathways, a GABAergic component has been reported among their terminals which were traced back to hilus as origin. Stimulation of commissural fibers stimulates DG hilar perforant path-associated (HIPP) and CA3 trilaminar cells antidromically.

== Hippocampal cells and layers ==
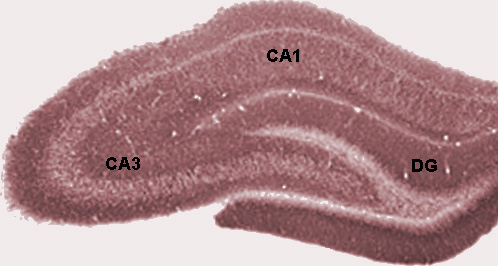
Photograph of hippocampal regions in a rat brain. DG: Dentate gyrus.

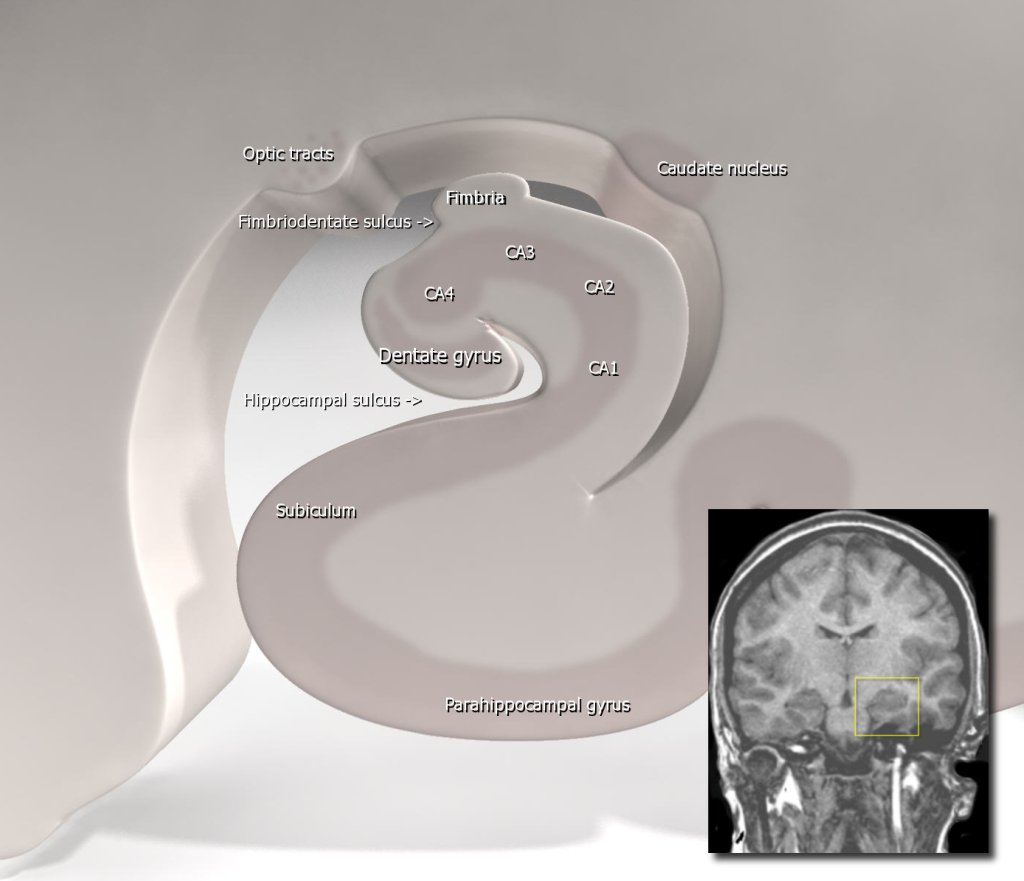
Schematic showing regions of the hippocampus proper in relation to other structures

The hippocampus is sometimes called the hippocampus proper and just includes the CA subfields (cornu Ammonis 1-4). The hippocampus, dentate gyrus, and other subfields make up the hippocampal formation. The dentate gyrus contains the fascia dentata and the hilus. The CA is differentiated into subfields CA1, CA2, CA3, and CA4. CA4 is often not referred to since it has been shown to be the deep, polymorphic layer of the dentate gyrus.

Differences in the thickness of the layers is caused by differences in cell densities, and numbers of axons.

In rodents, the hippocampus is positioned so that, roughly, one end is near the top of the head (the dorsal or septal end) and one end near the bottom of the head (the ventral or temporal end). As shown in the figure, the structure itself is curved and subfields or regions are defined along the curve, from CA4 through CA1 (only CA3 and CA1 are labeled). The CA regions are also structured depthwise in clearly defined strata (or layers):

- Stratum oriens is the next layer superficial to the alveus. The cell bodies of inhibitory basket cells and horizontal trilaminar cells, named for their axons innervating three layers—the oriens, Pyramidal, and radiatum are located in this stratum. The basal dendrites of Pyramidal neurons are also found here, where they receive input from other Pyramidal cells, septal fibers and commissural fibers from the contralateral hippocampus (usually recurrent connections, especially in CA3 and CA2.) In rodents the two hippocampi are highly connected, but in primates this commissural connection is much sparser.
- Stratum pyramidale contains the cell bodies of the pyramidal neurons, which are the principal excitatory neurons of the hippocampus. This stratum tends to be one of the more visible strata to the naked eye. In region CA3, this stratum contains synapses from the mossy fibers that course through stratum lucidum. This stratum also contains the cell bodies of many interneurons, including axo-axonic cells, bistratified cells, and radial trilaminar cells.
- Stratum lucidum is one of the thinnest strata in the hippocampus and only found in the CA3 region. Mossy fibers from the dentate gyrus granule cells course through this stratum in CA3, though synapses from these fibers can be found in stratum pyramidale.
- Stratum radiatum, like the stratum oriens, contains septal and commissural fibers. It also contains Schaffer collaterals, fibers that project forward from CA3 to CA1. Some interneurons that can be found in more superficial layers can also be found here, including basket cells, bistratified cells, and radial trilaminar cells.
- Stratum lacunosum is a thin stratum that too contains Schaffer collateral fibers, but it also contains perforant path fibers from the superficial layers of entorhinal cortex. Due to its small size, it is often grouped together with stratum moleculare into a single stratum called stratum lacunosum-moleculare.
- Stratum moleculare is the most superficial stratum in the hippocampus. Here the perforant path fibers form synapses onto the distal, apical dendrites of pyramidal cells.
- Hippocampal sulcus or fissure is a cell-free region that separates the CA1 field from the dentate gyrus. Because the phase of recorded theta rhythm varies systematically through the strata, the sulcus is often used as a fixed reference point for recording EEG as it is easily identifiable.

=== Dentate gyrus ===
The dentate gyrus is composed of a similar series of strata:

- The polymorphic layer is the most superficial layer of the dentate gyrus and is often considered a separate subfield (as the hilus). This layer contains many interneurons, and the axons of the dentate granule cells pass through this stratum on the way to CA3.
- Stratum granulosum contains the cell bodies of the dentate granule cells.
- Stratum moleculare, inner third is where both commissural fibers from the contralateral dentate gyrus run and form synapses as well as where inputs from the medial septum terminate, both on the proximal dendrites of the granule cells.
- Stratum moleculare, external two thirds is the deepest of the strata, sitting just superficial to the hippocampal sulcus across from stratum moleculare in the CA fields. The perforant path fibers run through this strata, making excitatory synapses onto the distal apical dendrites of granule cells.

An up-to-date knowledge base of hippocampal formation neuronal types, their biomarker profile, active and passive electrophysiological parameters, and connectivity is supported at the Hippocampome website.

== Bibliography ==
- Morris, Richard; Amaral, David (2024). The Hippocampus Book (2nd ed.). Oxford: Oxford University Press, Incorporated. ISBN 9780190065324.
- Purves, Dale (2012). Neuroscience (5th ed.). Sunderland, Mass: Sinauer. ISBN 978-0-87893-695-3.
