= Hippocampus =

Vertebrate brain region

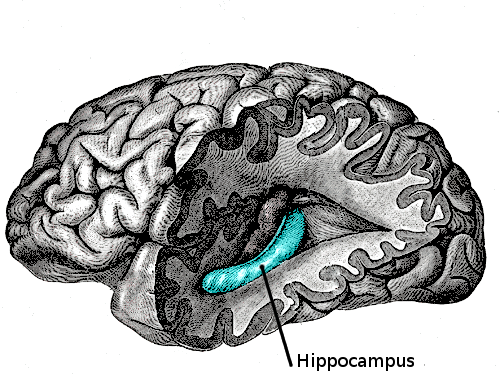
- Humans have two hippocampi, one in each hemisphere of the brain. They are located in the medial temporal lobe of the brain. In this lateral view of the human brain, the frontal lobe is at the left, the occipital lobe at the right, and the temporal and parietal lobes have largely been removed to reveal one of the hippocampi underneath.

- Hippocampus (lowest pink region) as part of the limbic system

Details
- Part of: Temporal lobe

Identifiers
- Latin: hippocampus
- MeSH: D006624
- NeuroNames: 3157
- NeuroLex ID: birnlex_721
- TA98: A14.1.09.321
- TA2: 5518
- FMA: 275020

The hippocampus (pl.: hippocampi), also proper, is a major component of the brain of humans and many other vertebrates. In the human brain the hippocampus, the dentate gyrus, and the subiculum are components of the hippocampal formation located in the limbic system. The hippocampus plays important roles in the consolidation of information from short-term memory to long-term memory, and in spatial memory that enables navigation. In humans and other primates the hippocampus is located in the archicortex, one of the three regions of allocortex, in each hemisphere with direct neural projections to, and reciprocal indirect projections from the neocortex. The hippocampus, as the medial pallium, is a structure found in all vertebrates.

In Alzheimer's disease (and other forms of dementia), the hippocampus is one of the first regions of the brain to be damaged; short-term memory loss and disorientation are included among the early symptoms. Damage to the hippocampus can also result from oxygen starvation (hypoxia), encephalitis, or medial temporal lobe epilepsy. People with extensive, bilateral hippocampal damage may experience anterograde amnesia: the inability to form and retain new memories.

Since different neuronal cell types are neatly organized into layers in the hippocampus, it has frequently been used as a model system for studying neurophysiology. The form of neural plasticity known as long-term potentiation (LTP) was initially discovered to occur in the hippocampus and has often been studied in this structure. LTP is widely believed to be one of the main neural mechanisms by which memories are stored in the brain.

Using rodents as model organisms, the hippocampus has been studied extensively as part of a brain system responsible for spatial memory and navigation. Many neurons in the rat and mouse hippocampi respond as place cells: that is, they fire bursts of action potentials when the animal passes through a specific part of its environment. Hippocampal place cells interact extensively with head direction cells, whose activity acts as an inertial compass, and conjecturally with grid cells in the neighboring entorhinal cortex.

== Name ==
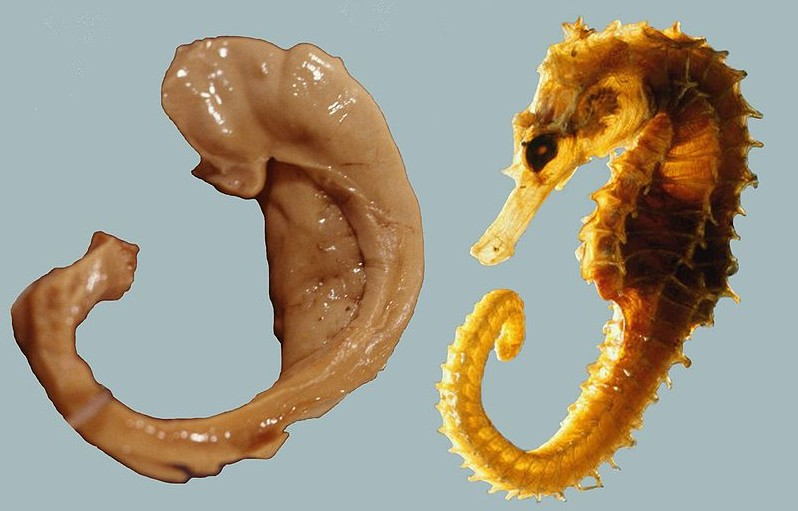
The human hippocampus and fornix (left) compared with a seahorse (right)

The earliest description of the ridge running along the floor of the inferior horn of the lateral ventricle comes from the Venetian anatomist Julius Caesar Aranzi (1587), who likened it first to a silkworm and then to a seahorse (Latin hippocampus, from Greek ἱππόκαμπος (latinised: ìppókampos) from ἵππος (ippos), 'horse' + κάμπος (kámpos), 'sea monster'). The German anatomist Johann Georg Duvernoy (1729), the first to illustrate the structure, also wavered between "seahorse" and "silkworm". "Ram's horn" was proposed by the Danish anatomist Jacob Winsløw in 1732; and a decade later his fellow Parisian, the surgeon de Garengeot, used cornu Ammonis – horn of Amun, after the ancient Egyptian god who was often represented as having a ram's head. Ammon is the Greek name for Amun.

The head region of the hippocampus is enlarged, and presents two or three rounded elevations or foot-like digitations, and hence it was named the pes hippocampi (pes meaning foot). Later this part was described as pes hippocampi major, with an adjacent bulge in the occipital horn of the lateral ventricle, described as pes hippocampi minor later renamed as the calcar avis. In 1786 Félix Vicq-d'Azyr published an authoritative description naming just the hippocampus but the term remained largely unused with no description of any function proposed until in the middle of the 20th century it was associated with memory.

Mayer mistakenly used the term hippopotamus in 1779, and was followed by some other authors until Karl Friedrich Burdach resolved this error in 1829. In 1861 the hippocampus minor became the center of a dispute over human evolution between Thomas Henry Huxley and Richard Owen, satirized as the Great Hippocampus Question. The term hippocampus minor fell from use in anatomy textbooks and was officially removed in the Nomina Anatomica of 1895. The modern term for the structure is just the hippocampus, with the term cornu Ammonis (that is, 'Ammon's horn') surviving in the names of the hippocampal subfields CA1–CA4.

== In the limbic system ==
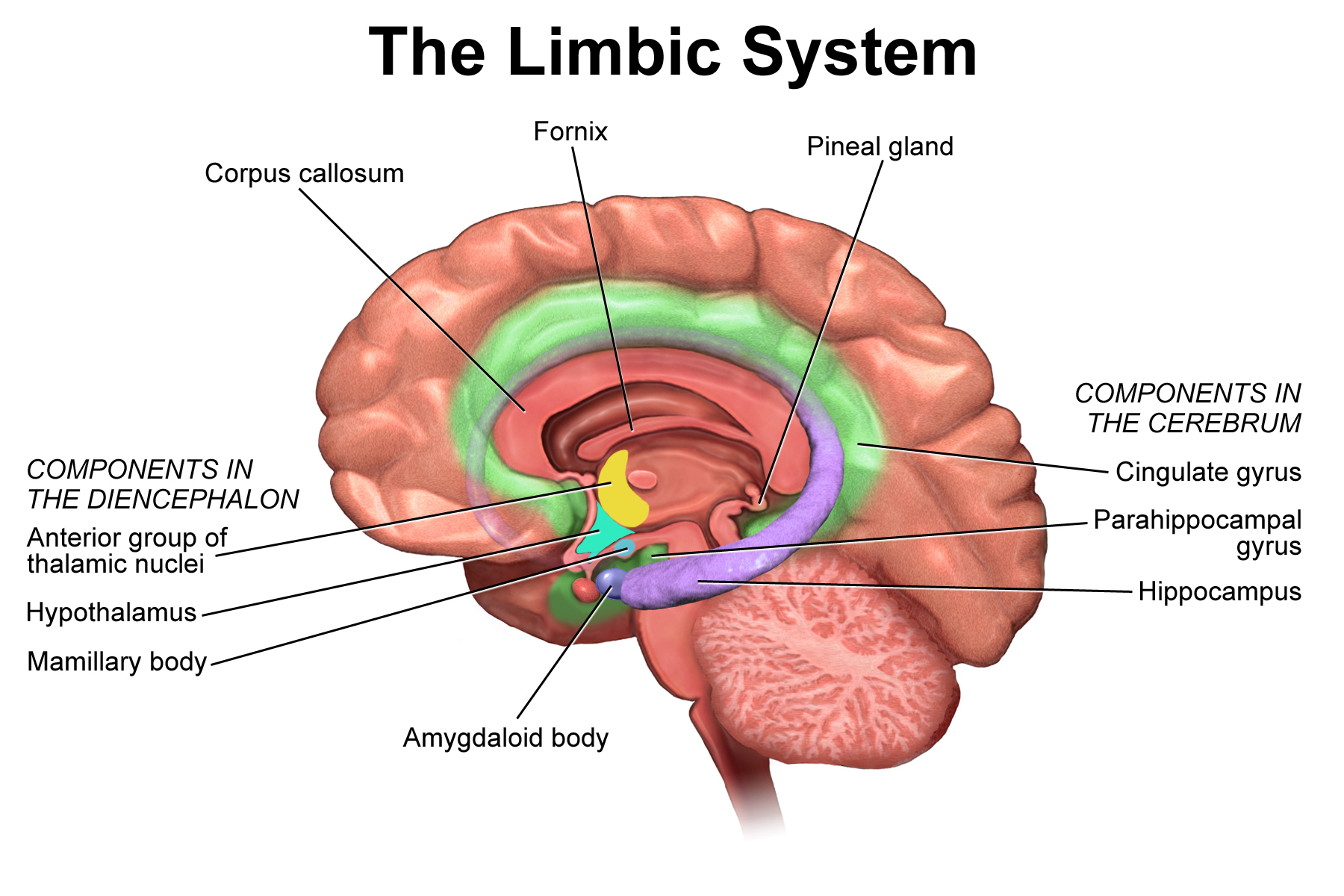
Hippocampus in the limbic system

The hippocampus is one of the structures of the limbic lobe, first described by Broca in 1878, as the cortical areas that line the deep edge of the cerebral cortex. The limbic lobe is the main component of the limbic system. The cingulate gyrus, and the parahippocampal gyrus are the two main parts of the described lobe, which had been largely associated with olfaction. Many studies later culminating in work by Papez, and MacLean, the involvement of other interacting brain regions associated with emotion was recognized. The hippocampus is anatomically connected to parts of the brain that are involved with emotional behavior, including the septal area, the hypothalamic mammillary bodies, and the anterior nuclear complex in the thalamus. MacLean proposed that the associated structures of the limbic lobe be included in what he termed as the limbic system.

== Anatomy ==
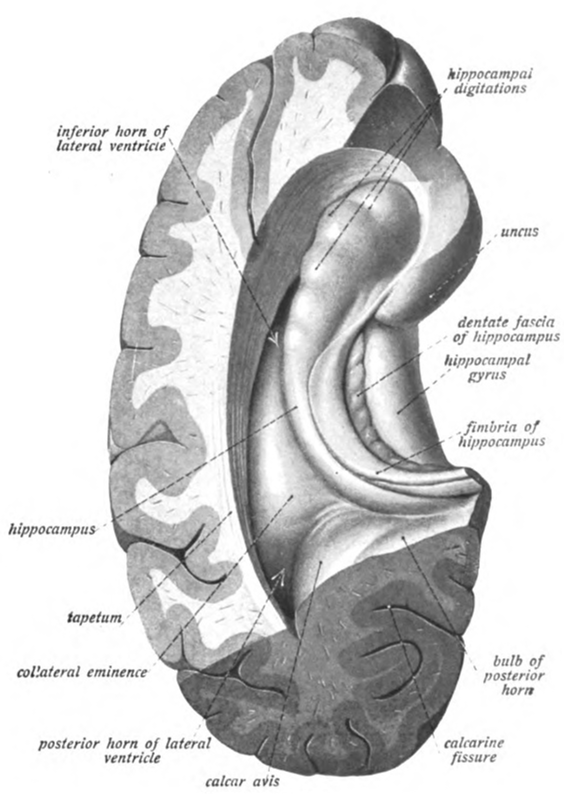
Cross-section of cerebral hemisphere showing structure and location of hippocampus

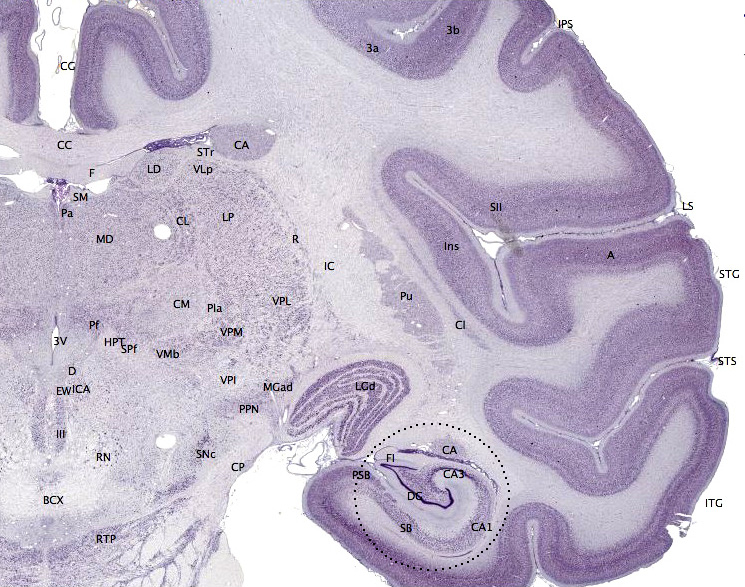
Coronal section of the brain of a macaque monkey, showing hippocampal formation (circled)

The hippocampus is a five centimeter long ridge of gray matter tissue within the parahippocampal gyrus that can only be seen when the gyrus is opened. The hippocampus is an inward fold of three-layered archicortex (one of three regions of the allocortex) into the medial temporal lobe of the brain, where it elevates into the floor of each lateral ventricle inferior horn. The hippocampus stretches along its anterior-posterior axis, from the amygdala to the splenium of the corpus callosum, with the head, body, and tail as subregions of this axis. The dentate gyrus, CA subfields, fimbria, and subiculum are divisions across the short axis, the proximal-distal axis.

The hippocampal formation refers to the hippocampus, and its related adjoining parts to include the dentate gyrus, the subiculum, the presubiculum, parasubiculum, and the entorhinal cortex. Sometimes the subiculum, presubiculum, and parasubiculum are grouped together as the subicular complex, but the regions are neuroanatomically distinct. Some sources may only include the hippocampus, dentate gyrus, and subiculum, being regions of the hippocampal three-layered archicortex. But the six regions are linked together serially by almost unidirectional neural pathways. Other sources include the indusium griseum, gyrus fasciolaris, the medial and longitudinal striae, and uncus, and exclude subicular regions. The neural layout and pathways within the hippocampal formation are very similar in all mammals.

The hippocampus has a generally similar appearance across the range of mammals, from egg-laying mammals such as the echidna, to humans and other primates. The hippocampal-size-to-body-size ratio broadly increases, being about twice as large for primates as for the echidna. It does not, however, increase at anywhere close to the rate of the neocortex-to-body-size ratio. Therefore, the hippocampus takes up a much larger fraction of the cortical mantle in rodents than in primates. In adult humans the volume of the hippocampus on each side of the brain is about 3.0 to 3.5 cm^{3} as compared to 320 to 420 cm^{3} for the volume of the neocortex. There is also a general relationship between the size of the hippocampus and spatial memory. When comparisons are made between similar species, those that have a greater capacity for spatial memory tend to have larger hippocampal volumes.

== Neuroanatomy ==
The hippocampus and dentate gyrus that is folded into the hippocampal archicortex have the shape of a curved, rolled-up tube. The curve of the hippocampus (known as cornu Ammonis) uses the initial letters CA to name the hippocampal subfields CA1-CA4. CA4 is in fact the polymorphic layer or hilus of the dentate gyrus, but CA4 is still sometimes in use to describe the part of CA3 that inserts between the dentate gyrus regions or blades. It can be distinguished as an area where the cortex narrows into a single layer of densely packed pyramidal neurons, which curl into a tight U shape. One edge of the "U" is CA4, the hilus of the dentate gyrus. This is embedded into the backward-facing, flexed dentate gyrus.

In humans the hippocampus is described as having an anterior and posterior part; in other primates they are termed rostral and caudal, and in rodents they are termed ventral and dorsal. Both parts are of similar composition but belong to different neural circuits. The dentate gyrus combined with other hippocampal regions form a banana-like structure, with the two hippocampi joined at the stems by the commissure of fornix (also called the hippocampal commissure).

In humans and other primates, the part of the hippocampus at the bottom, near the base of the temporal lobe, is much broader than the part at the top. This means that in cross-section the hippocampus can show a number of different shapes, depending on the angle and location of the cut.

In a cross-section of the hippocampus, including the dentate gyrus, several layers will be shown. The dentate gyrus has three layers of cells – the outer molecular layer, the middle granular layer, and the inner polymorphic layer also known as the hilus. The CA3 subfield has the following cell layers known as strata: lacunosum-moleculare, radiatum, lucidum, pyramidal, and oriens. CA2 and CA1 also have these layers except the lucidum stratum.

The input to the hippocampus (from varying cortical and subcortical structures) comes from the entorhinal cortex via the perforant path. The entorhinal cortex (EC) is strongly and reciprocally connected with many cortical and subcortical structures as well as with the brainstem. Different thalamic nuclei, (from the anterior and midline groups), the medial septal nucleus, the supramammillary nucleus of the hypothalamus, and the raphe nuclei and locus coeruleus of the brainstem all send axons to the EC, so that it serves as the interface between the neocortex and the other connections, and the hippocampus.

The EC is located in the parahippocampal gyrus, a cortical region adjacent to the hippocampus. This gyrus conceals the hippocampus. The parahippocampal gyrus is adjacent to the perirhinal cortex, which plays an important role in the visual recognition of complex objects. There is also substantial evidence that it makes a contribution to memory, which can be distinguished from the contribution of the hippocampus. It is apparent that complete amnesia occurs only when both the hippocampus and the parahippocampus are damaged.

=== Circuitry ===
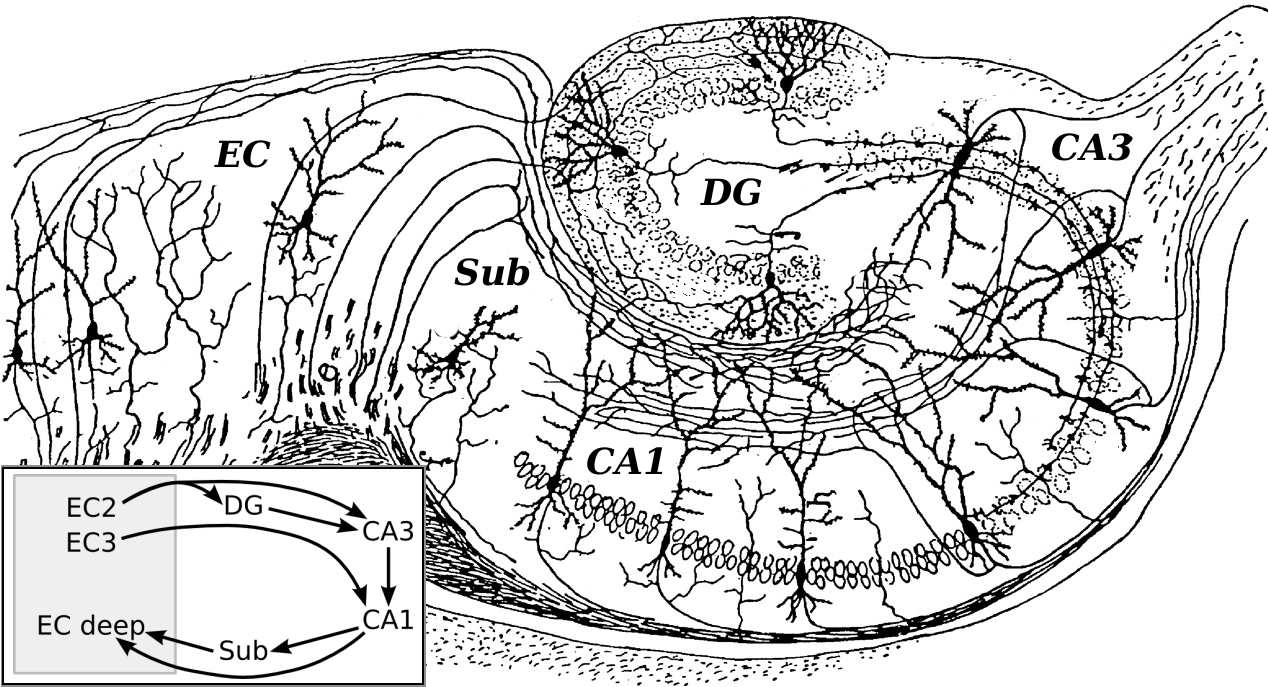
Basic circuit of the hippocampus, as drawn by Ramón y Cajal. DG: dentate gyrus. Sub: subiculum. EC: entorhinal cortex

The major input to the hippocampus is through the entorhinal cortex (EC), whereas its major output is via CA1 to the subiculum. Information reaches CA1 via two main pathways, direct and indirect. Axons from the EC that originate in layer III are the origin of the direct perforant pathway and form synapses on the very distal apical dendrites of CA1 neurons. Conversely, axons originating from layer II are the origin of the indirect pathway, and information reaches CA1 via the trisynaptic circuit. In the initial part of this pathway, the axons project through the perforant pathway to the granule cells of the dentate gyrus (first synapse). From then, the information follows via the mossy cell fibers to CA3 (second synapse). From there, CA3 axons called Schaffer collaterals leave the deep part of the cell body and loop up to the apical dendrites and then extend to CA1 (third synapse). Axons from CA1 then project back to the entorhinal cortex, completing the circuit.

Basket cells in CA3 receive excitatory input from the pyramidal cells and then give an inhibitory feedback to the pyramidal cells. This recurrent inhibition is a simple feedback circuit that can dampen excitatory responses in the hippocampus. The pyramidal cells give a recurrent excitation which is an important mechanism found in some memory processing microcircuits.

Several other connections play important roles in hippocampal function. Beyond the output to the EC, additional output pathways go to other cortical areas including the prefrontal cortex. A major output goes via the fornix to the lateral septal area and to the mammillary body of the hypothalamus (which the fornix interconnects with the hippocampus). The hippocampus receives modulatory input from the serotonin, norepinephrine, and dopamine systems, and from the nucleus reuniens of the thalamus to field CA1. A very important projection comes from the medial septal nucleus, which sends cholinergic, and gamma amino butyric acid (GABA) stimulating fibers (GABAergic fibers) to all parts of the hippocampus. The inputs from the medial septal nucleus play a key role in controlling the physiological state of the hippocampus; destruction of this nucleus abolishes the hippocampal theta rhythm and impairs spatial memory.

=== Subfields ===
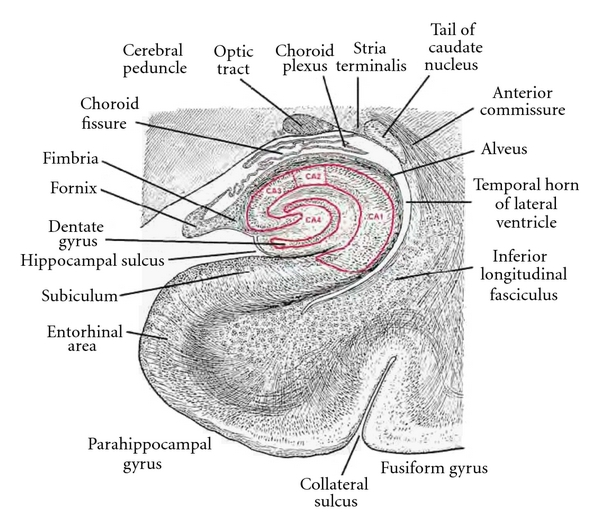
Hippocampal subfields and subregions

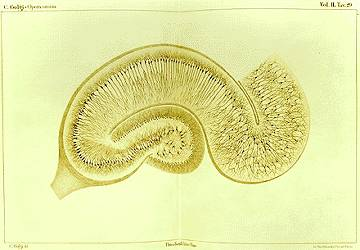
Drawing by Italian pathologist Camillo Golgi of a hippocampus stained using silver nitrate

The hippocampal subfields (CA1-CA4), and subregions, head, body, and tail, are functionally and anatomically differentiated, and connect differently to other brain regions. Their cells are morphologically different. They also have different levels of vulnerability to disease.

In humans the head of the hippocampus is also termed the anterior hippocampus, the body is the intermediate hippocampus, and the tail the posterior hippocampus. The terms used for corresponding subregions in other primates are anterior (or rostral), intermediate and posterior (or caudal) and in rodents ventral or temporal, intermediate and dorsal (or septal). The subregions along the longitudinal axis have been linked to different functions, project with different neural pathways, and have varying numbers of place cells with differentially sized place fields. For example, the posterior hippocampus has particularly been linked to spatial memory. In the rat, the dorsal hippocampus has more place cells than both the ventral and intermediate hippocampal regions, and place cells in the dorsal hippocampal provide a more fine-grained representation of the spatial environment than in the intermediate and ventral hippocampus.

The intermediate hippocampus has overlapping characteristics with both the ventral and dorsal hippocampus. Studies in 2002, showed that alterations to the ventral hippocampus reduced the amount of information sent to the amygdala by the dorsal and ventral hippocampus, consequently altering fear conditioning in rats. In 2007, studies using anterograde tracing methods, located the moderate projections to two primary olfactory cortical areas and prelimbic areas of the medial prefrontal cortex. This region has the smallest number of place cells. The ventral hippocampus has been particularly linked to fear conditioning and affective processes.

== Function ==
=== Theories ===
Three main theories of hippocampal function have been in dominance: response inhibition, episodic memory, and spatial cognition. The response inhibition theory (caricatured by John O'Keefe and Lynn Nadel as "slam on the brakes!") was very popular up to the 1960s. It was based largely on two observations: first, that animals with hippocampal damage tend to be hyperactive; second, that animals with hippocampal damage often have difficulty learning to inhibit previously learnt responses, especially if the response requires remaining quiet as in a passive avoidance test. British psychologist Jeffrey Gray developed this line of thought into a complete theory of the role of the hippocampus in anxiety, called the behavioral inhibition system.

The second major line of thought relates the hippocampus to memory. Although it had historical precursors, this idea derived its main impetus from a famous report by American neurosurgeon William Beecher Scoville and British-Canadian neuropsychologist Brenda Milner. It described the results of surgical destruction of the hippocampi when trying to relieve epileptic seizures in an American man Henry Molaison, known until his death in 2008 as "Patient H.M." The unexpected outcome of the surgery was severe anterograde, and partial retrograde amnesia; Molaison was unable to form new episodic memories after his surgery and could not remember any events that occurred just before his surgery, but he did retain memories of events that occurred many years earlier extending back into his childhood. This case attracted such widespread professional interest that Molaison became the most intensively studied subject in medical history.

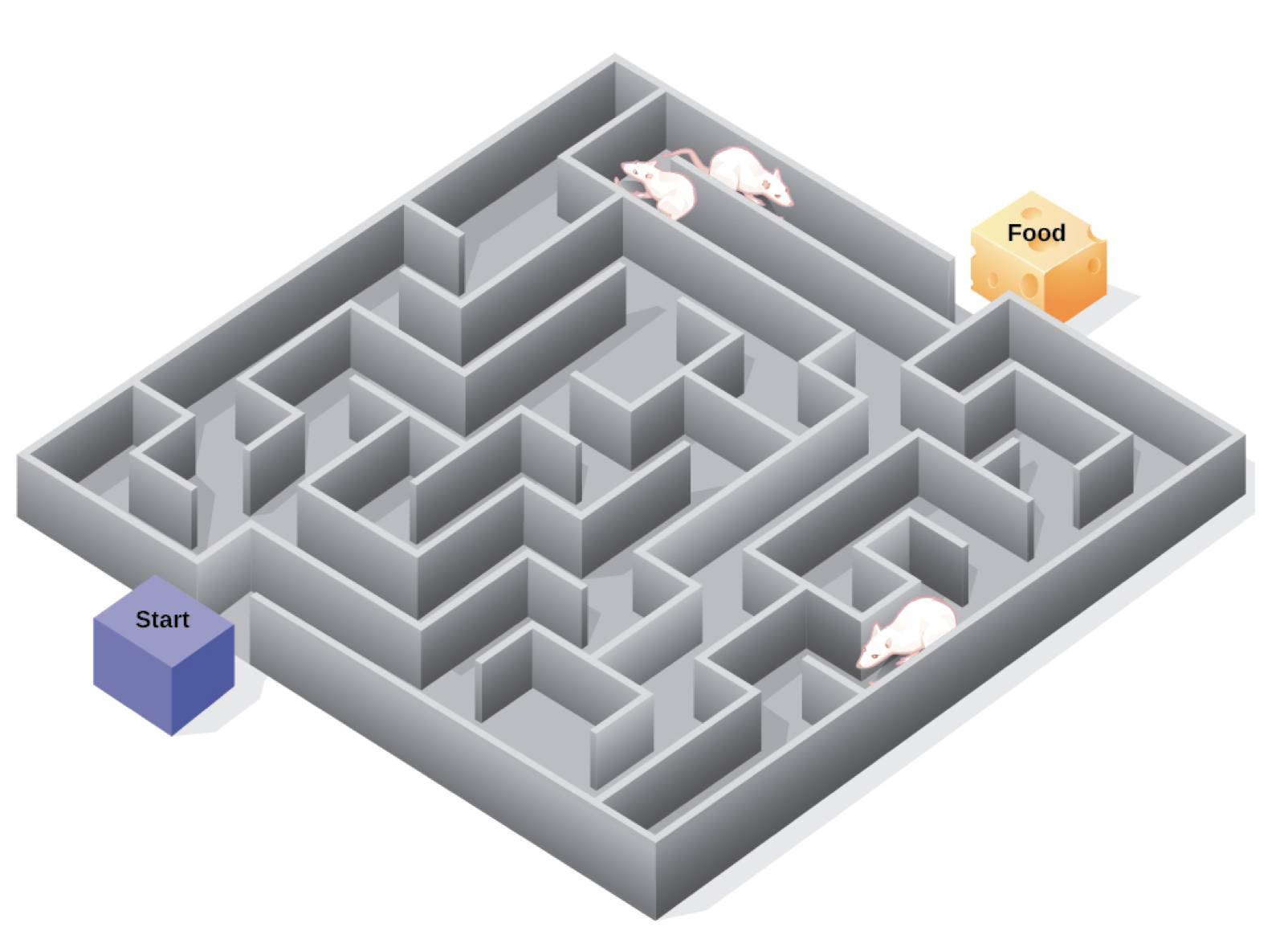
Rats and cognitive maps

The third important theory of hippocampal function relates the hippocampus to space, and spatial memory, with the idea of a cognitive map first proposed by American psychologist E.C. Tolman. This theory was followed further by O'Keefe, and in 1971, he and his student Dostrovsky discovered neurons in the rat hippocampus that seemed to show activity related to the rat's location within its environment. The neurons were described as place cells. A book was later produced in 1978, The Hippocampus as a Cognitive Map written by O'Keefe and Nadel. It has been generally agreed that the hippocampus plays a key role in spatial coding but the details are widely debated.

Research has focused on trying to bridge the disconnect between the two main views of hippocampal function as being split between memory and spatial cognition. In some studies, these areas have been expanded to the point of near convergence. In an attempt to reconcile the two disparate views, it is suggested that a broader view of the hippocampal function is taken and seen to have a role that encompasses both the organization of experience (mental mapping, as per Tolman's original concept in 1948) and the directional behavior seen as being involved in all areas of cognition, so that the function of the hippocampus can be viewed as a broader system that incorporates both the memory and the spatial perspectives in its role that involves the use of a wide scope of cognitive maps. This relates to the purposive behaviorism born of Tolman's original goal of identifying the complex cognitive mechanisms and purposes that guided behavior.

It has also been proposed that the spiking activity of hippocampal neurons is associated spatially, and it was suggested that the mechanisms of memory and planning both evolved from mechanisms of navigation and that their neuronal algorithms were basically the same.

Many studies have made use of neuroimaging techniques such as functional magnetic resonance imaging (fMRI), and a functional role in approach-avoidance conflict has been noted. The anterior hippocampus is seen to be involved in decision-making under approach-avoidance conflict processing. It is suggested that the memory, spatial cognition, and conflict processing functions may be seen as working together and not mutually exclusive.

=== Role in memory ===
The hallmark function of the hippocampus is the formation of explicit memory, also known as declarative memory. Episodic memory, and semantic memory are the two components of explicit memory. The hippocampus also encodes emotional context from the amygdala. This is partly why returning to a location where an emotional event occurred may evoke that emotion. There is a deep emotional connection between episodic memories and places.

Due to bilateral symmetry the brain has a hippocampus in each cerebral hemisphere. If damage to the hippocampus occurs in only one hemisphere, leaving the structure intact in the other hemisphere, the brain can retain near-normal memory functioning. Severe damage to the hippocampi in both hemispheres results in profound difficulties in forming new memories (anterograde amnesia) and often also affects memories formed before the damage occurred (retrograde amnesia). Although the retrograde effect normally extends many years back before the brain damage, in some cases older memories remain. This retention of older memories leads to the idea that consolidation over time involves the transfer of memories out of the hippocampus to other parts of the brain. Experiments using intrahippocampal transplantation of hippocampal cells in primates with neurotoxic lesions of the hippocampus have shown that the hippocampus is required for the formation and recall, but not the storage, of memories. It has been shown that a decrease in the volume of various parts of the hippocampus leads to specific memory impairments. In particular, efficiency of verbal memory retention is related to the anterior parts of the right and left hippocampus. The right head of the hippocampus is more involved in executive functions and regulation during verbal memory recall. The tail of the left hippocampus tends to be closely related to verbal memory capacity.

Damage to the hippocampus does not affect some types of memory, such as the ability to learn new skills (playing a musical instrument or solving certain types of puzzles, for example). This fact suggests that such abilities depend on different types of memory such as procedural memory in implicit memory function, implicating different brain regions. Furthermore, amnesic patients frequently show implicit memory for experiences even in the absence of conscious knowledge. For example, patients asked to guess which of two faces they have seen most recently may give the correct answer most of the time in spite of stating that they have never seen either of the faces before. Some researchers distinguish between conscious recollection, which depends on the hippocampus, and familiarity, which depends on portions of the medial temporal lobe. A study claims to have confirmed that the hippocampus is not associated with implicit memory. But other sources say the question is still up for debate (as of 2024).

When rats are exposed to an intense learning event, they may retain a life-long memory of the event even after a single training session. The memory of such an event appears to be first stored in the hippocampus, but this storage is transient. Much of the long-term storage of the memory seems to take place in the anterior cingulate cortex. When such an intense learning event was experimentally applied, more than 5,000 differently methylated DNA regions appeared in the hippocampus neuronal genome of the rats at one hour and at 24 hours after training. These alterations in methylation pattern occurred at many genes that were down-regulated, often due to the formation of new 5-methylcytosine sites in CpG rich regions of the genome. Furthermore, many other genes were upregulated, likely often due to the removal of methyl groups from previously existing 5-methylcytosines (5mCs) in DNA. Demethylation of 5mC can be carried out by several proteins acting in concert, including TET enzymes as well as enzymes of the DNA base excision repair pathway.

==== Between systems model ====
The between-systems memory interference model describes the inhibition of non-hippocampal systems of memory during concurrent hippocampal activity. Specifically it was found that when the hippocampus was inactive, non-hippocampal systems located elsewhere in the brain were found to consolidate memory in its place. However, when the hippocampus was reactivated, memory traces consolidated by non-hippocampal systems were not recalled, suggesting that the hippocampus interferes with long-term memory consolidation in other memory-related systems.

One of the major implications that this model illustrates is the dominant effects of the hippocampus on non-hippocampal networks when information is incongruent. With this information in mind, future directions could lead towards the study of these non-hippocampal memory systems through hippocampal inactivation, further expanding the labile constructs of memory. Additionally, many theories of memory are holistically based around the hippocampus. This model could add beneficial information to hippocampal research and memory theories such as the multiple trace theory. Lastly, the between-system memory interference model allows researchers to evaluate their results on a multiple-systems model, suggesting that some effects may not be simply mediated by one portion of the brain.

=== Role in spatial memory and navigation ===
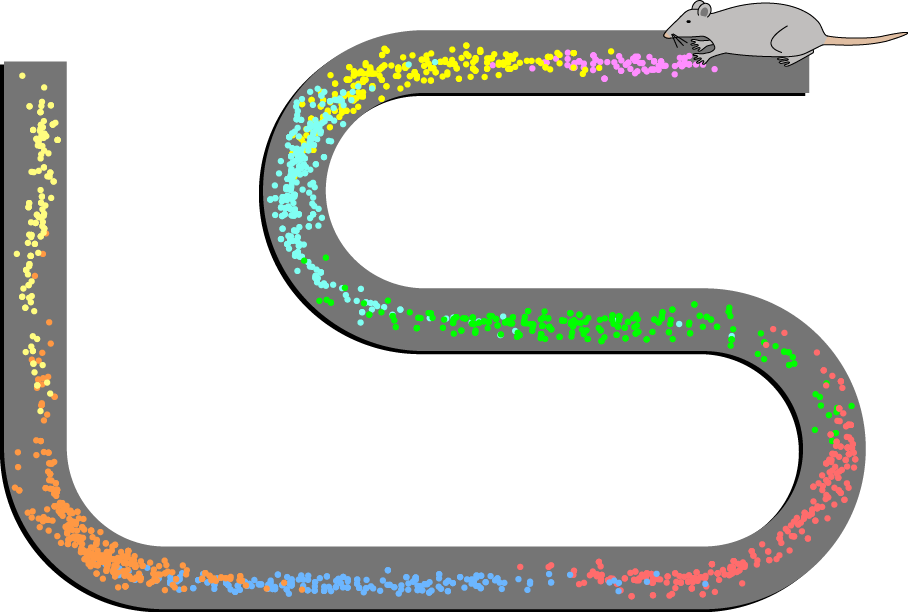
Spatial firing patterns of eight place cells recorded from the CA1 layer of a rat. The rat ran back and forth along an elevated track, stopping at each end to eat a small food reward. Dots indicate positions where action potentials were recorded, with color indicating which neuron emitted that action potential.

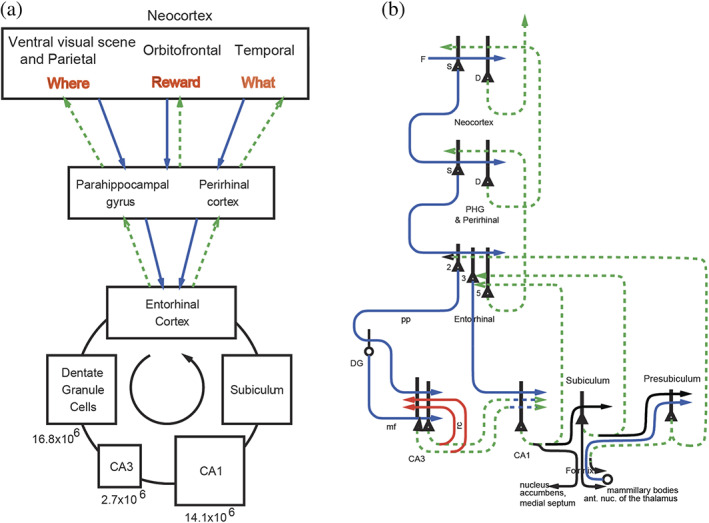
Hippocampal connections in spatial cognition

There are several types of navigational cells in the brain that are either in the hippocampus itself or are strongly connected to it. They include the place cells, speed cells present in the medial entorhinal cortex, head direction cells, grid cells, and boundary cells. Together these cells form a network that serves as spatial memory.

The first of these types of cell discovered in the 1970s were the place cells, which led to the idea of the hippocampus acting to give a neural representation of the environment in a cognitive map. When the hippocampus is dysfunctional, orientation is affected; people may have difficulty in remembering how they arrived at a location and how to proceed further. Getting lost is a common symptom of amnesia. Studies with animals have shown that an intact hippocampus is required for initial learning and long-term retention of some spatial memory tasks, in particular ones that require finding the way to a hidden goal.

Studies on freely moving rats and mice have shown many hippocampal neurons to act as place cells that cluster in place fields, and these fire bursts of action potentials when the animal passes through a particular location. Hippocampal place cells interact extensively with head direction cells, whose activity acts as an inertial compass, and conjecturally with grid cells in the neighboring entorhinal cortex. Speed cells are thought to provide input to the hippocampal grid cells. This place-related neural activity in the hippocampus has also been reported in monkeys that were moved around a room whilst in a restraint chair. However, the place cells may have fired in relation to where the monkey was looking rather than to its actual location in the room. Over many years, many studies have been carried out on place-responses in rodents, which have given a large amount of information. Place cell responses are shown by pyramidal cells in the hippocampus and by granule cells in the dentate gyrus. Other cells in smaller proportion are inhibitory interneurons, and these often show place-related variations in their firing rate that are much weaker. There is little, if any, spatial topography in the representation; in general, cells lying next to each other in the hippocampus have uncorrelated spatial firing patterns. Place cells are typically almost silent when a rat is moving around outside the place field but reach sustained rates as high as 40 Hz when the rat is near the center. Neural activity sampled from 30 to 40 randomly chosen place cells carries enough information to allow a rat's location to be reconstructed with high confidence. The size of place fields varies in a gradient along the length of the hippocampus, with cells at the dorsal end showing the smallest fields, cells near the center showing larger fields, and cells at the ventral tip showing fields that cover the entire environment. In some cases, the firing rate of hippocampal cells depends not only on place but also the direction a rat is moving, the destination toward which it is traveling, or other task-related variables. The firing of place cells is timed in relation to local theta waves, a spatiotemporal process termed phase precession.

Cells with location-specific firing patterns have been reported during a study of people with drug-resistant epilepsy. They were undergoing an invasive procedure to localize the source of their seizures, with a view to surgical resection. They had diagnostic electrodes implanted in their hippocampi and then used a computer to move around in a virtual reality town. Similar brain imaging studies in navigation have shown the hippocampus to be active. A study was carried out on taxi drivers. London's black cab drivers need to learn the locations of a large number of places and the fastest routes between them in order to pass a strict test known as The Knowledge in order to gain a license to operate. A study showed that the posterior part of the hippocampus is larger in these drivers than in the general public, and that a positive correlation exists between the length of time served as a driver and the increase in the volume of this part. It was also found the total volume of the hippocampus was unchanged, as the increase seen in the posterior part was made at the expense of the anterior part, which showed a relative decrease in size. There have been no reported adverse effects from this disparity in hippocampal proportions. Another study showed opposite findings in blind individuals. The anterior part of the right hippocampus was larger and the posterior part was smaller, compared with sighted individuals.

=== Role in approach-avoidance conflict processing ===
Approach-avoidance conflict happens when a situation is presented that can either be rewarding or punishing, and the ensuing decision-making has been associated with anxiety. fMRI findings from studies in approach-avoidance decision-making found evidence for a functional role that is not explained by either long-term memory or spatial cognition. Overall findings showed that the anterior hippocampus is sensitive to conflict, and that it may be part of a larger cortical and subcortical network seen to be important in decision-making in uncertain conditions.

A review makes reference to a number of studies that show the involvement of the hippocampus in conflict tasks. The authors suggest that one challenge is to understand how conflict processing relates to the functions of spatial navigation and memory and how all of these functions need not be mutually exclusive.

=== Role in social memory ===
The hippocampus has received renewed attention for its role in social memory. Epileptic human subjects with depth electrodes in the left posterior, left anterior or right anterior hippocampus demonstrate distinct, individual cell responses when presented with faces of presumably recognizable famous people. Associations among facial and vocal identity were similarly mapped to the hippocampus of rhesus monkeys. Single neurons in the CA1 and CA3 responded strongly to social stimulus recognition by MRI. The CA2 was not distinguished, and may likely comprise a proportion of the claimed CA1 cells in the study. The dorsal CA2 and ventral CA1 subregions of the hippocampus have been implicated in social memory processing. Genetic inactivation of CA2 pyramidal neurons leads to pronounced loss of social memory, while maintaining intact sociability in mice. Similarly, ventral CA1 pyramidal neurons have also been demonstrated as critical for social memory under optogenetic control in mice.

=== Role in olfaction ===
In the early 20th century, the widely held view was that olfaction was a major hippocampal function. This view was argued against, pointing out that the hippocampus was present in some animals such as dolphins and whales, that did not have a sense of smell; and further that lesions in the temporal lobe in dogs had been shown to have no effect on their sense of smell. These arguments were concluded in 1947 and held for a few more decades. In 1984, and 1987, studies in the rat showed that the entorhinal cortex receives substantial input from the olfactory bulb, with part of the EC being directly innervated by the lateral olfactory tract. Secondary inputs to the EC were also shown to include some from the periamygdaloid and piriform cortices, and CA1 in the ventral hippocampus was shown to sends axons to the main olfactory bulb. It is evident that the hippocampus does have an involvement in memory for odors.

== Physiology ==
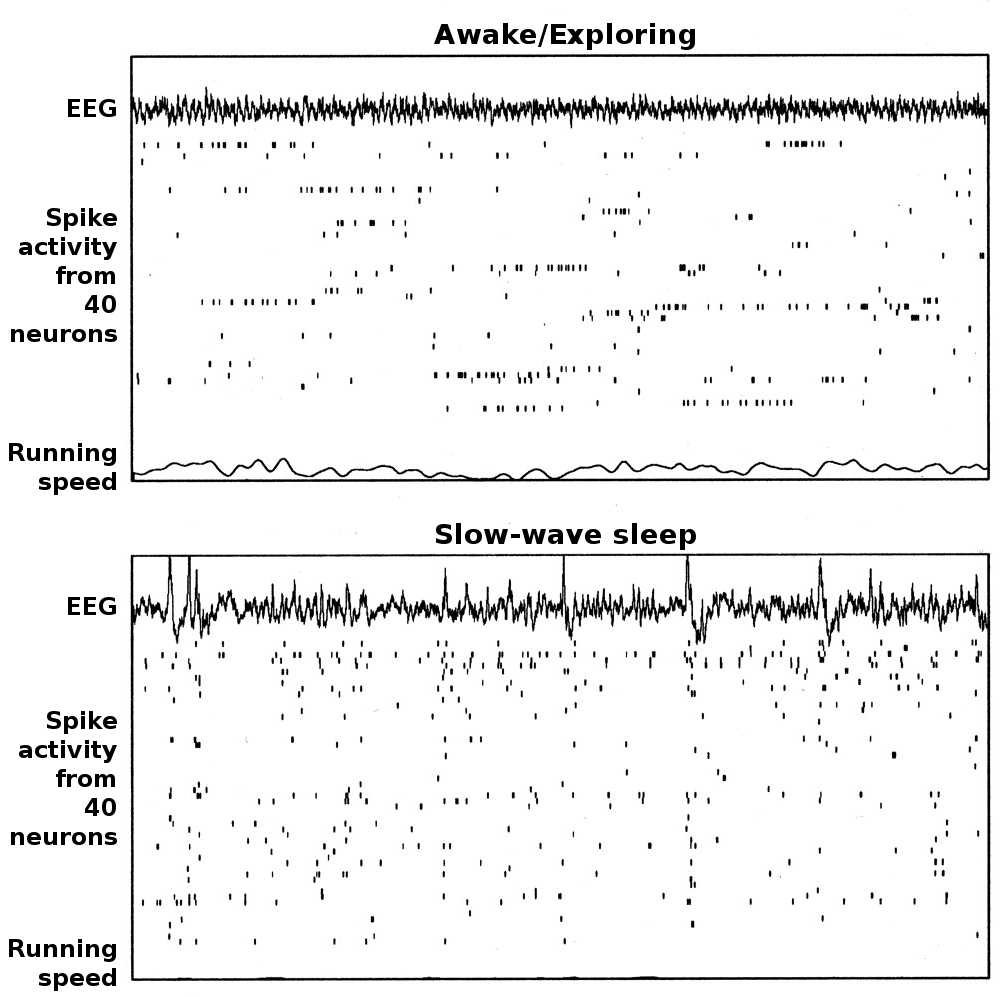
Examples of rat hippocampal EEG and CA1 neural activity in the theta (awake/behaving) and LIA (slow-wave sleep) modes. Each plot shows 20 seconds of data, with a hippocampal EEG trace at the top, spike rasters from 40 simultaneously recorded CA1 pyramidal cells in the middle (each raster line represents a different cell), and a plot of running speed at the bottom. The top plot represents a time period during which the rat was actively searching for scattered food pellets. For the bottom plot the rat was asleep.

The hippocampus shows two major modes of activity, each associated with a distinct pattern of neural population activity and waves of electrical activity as measured by an electroencephalogram (EEG). These modes are named after the EEG patterns associated with them: theta and large irregular activity (LIA). The main characteristics described below are for the rat, which is the animal most extensively studied.

The theta mode appears during states of active, alert behavior (especially locomotion), and also during REM sleep (dreaming). In the theta mode, the EEG is dominated by large regular waves with a frequency range of 6 to 9 Hz, and the main groups of hippocampal neurons (pyramidal cells and granule cells) show sparse population activity, which means that in any short time interval, the great majority of cells are silent, while the small remaining fraction fire at relatively high rates, up to 50 spikes in one second for the most active of them. An active cell typically stays active for half a second to a few seconds. As the rat behaves, the active cells fall silent and new cells become active, but the overall percentage of active cells remains more or less constant. In many situations, cell activity is determined largely by the spatial location of the animal, but other behavioral variables also clearly influence it.

The LIA mode appears during slow-wave sleep (non-dreaming), and also during states of waking immobility such as resting or eating. In the LIA mode, the EEG is dominated by sharp waves that are randomly timed large deflections of the EEG signal lasting for 25–50 milliseconds. Sharp waves are frequently generated in sets, with sets containing up to 5 or more individual sharp waves and lasting up to 500 ms. The spiking activity of neurons within the hippocampus is highly correlated with sharp wave activity. Most neurons decrease their firing rate between sharp waves; however, during a sharp wave, there is a dramatic increase in firing rate in up to 10% of the hippocampal population.

These two hippocampal activity modes can be seen in primates as well as rats, with the exception that it has been difficult to see robust theta rhythmicity in the primate hippocampus. There are, however, qualitatively similar sharp waves and similar state-dependent changes in neural population activity.

=== Hippocampal theta rhythm ===
Example of a one-second EEG theta wave

The underlying currents producing the theta wave are generated mainly by densely packed neural layers of the entorhinal cortex, CA3, and the dendrites of pyramidal cells. The theta wave is one of the largest signals seen on EEG, and is known as the hippocampal theta rhythm. In some situations the EEG is dominated by regular waves at 3 to 10 Hz, often continuing for many seconds. These reflect subthreshold membrane potentials and strongly modulate the spiking of hippocampal neurons and synchronize across the hippocampus in a travelling wave pattern. The trisynaptic circuit is a relay of neurotransmission in the hippocampus that interacts with many brain regions. From rodent studies it has been proposed that the trisynaptic circuit generates the hippocampal theta rhythm.

Theta rhythmicity previously clearly shown in rabbits and rodents has also been shown in humans. In rats (the animals that have been the most extensively studied), theta is seen mainly in two conditions: first, when an animal is walking or in some other way actively interacting with its surroundings; second, during REM sleep. The function of theta has not yet been convincingly explained although numerous theories have been proposed. The most popular hypothesis has been to relate it to learning and memory. An example would be the phase with which theta rhythms, at the time of stimulation of a neuron, shape the effect of that stimulation upon its synapses. What is meant here is that theta rhythms may affect those aspects of learning and memory that are dependent upon synaptic plasticity. It is well established that lesions of the medial septum – the central node of the theta system – cause severe disruptions of memory. However, the medial septum is more than just the controller of theta; it is also the main source of cholinergic projections to the hippocampus. It has not been established that septal lesions exert their effects specifically by eliminating the theta rhythm.

=== Sharp waves ===
During sleep or during resting, when an animal is not engaged with its surroundings, the hippocampal EEG shows a pattern of irregular slow waves, somewhat larger in amplitude than theta waves. This pattern is occasionally interrupted by large surges called sharp waves. These events are associated with bursts of spike activity lasting 50 to 100 milliseconds in pyramidal cells of CA3 and CA1. They are also associated with short-lived high-frequency EEG oscillations called "ripples", with frequencies in the range 150 to 200 Hz in rats, and together they are known as sharp waves and ripples. Sharp waves are most frequent during sleep when they occur at an average rate of around 1 per second (in rats) but in a very irregular temporal pattern. Sharp waves are less frequent during inactive waking states and are usually smaller. Sharp waves have also been observed in humans and monkeys. In macaques, sharp waves are robust but do not occur as frequently as in rats.

Sharp waves appear to be associated with memory. Numerous later studies, have reported that when hippocampal place cells have overlapping spatial firing fields (and therefore often fire in near-simultaneity), they tend to show correlated activity during sleep following the behavioral session. This enhancement of correlation, commonly known as reactivation, has been found to occur mainly during sharp waves. It has been proposed that sharp waves are, in fact, reactivations of neural activity patterns that were memorized during behavior, driven by strengthening of synaptic connections within the hippocampus. This idea forms a key component of the "two-stage memory" theory, advocated by Buzsáki and others, which proposes that memories are stored within the hippocampus during behavior and then later transferred to the neocortex during sleep. Sharp waves in Hebbian theory are seen as persistently repeated stimulations by presynaptic cells, of postsynaptic cells that are suggested to drive synaptic changes in the cortical targets of hippocampal output pathways. Suppression of sharp waves and ripples in sleep or during immobility can interfere with memories expressed at the level of the behavior, nonetheless, the newly formed CA1 place cell code can re-emerge even after a sleep with abolished sharp waves and ripples, in spatially non-demanding tasks.

=== Long-term potentiation ===
Since at least the time of Ramon y Cajal (1852–1934), psychologists have speculated that the brain stores memory by altering the strength of connections between neurons that are simultaneously active. This idea was formalized by Donald Hebb in 1949, but for many years remained unexplained. In 1973, Tim Bliss and Terje Lømo described a phenomenon in the rabbit hippocampus that appeared to meet Hebb's specifications: a change in synaptic responsiveness induced by brief strong activation and lasting for hours or days or longer. This phenomenon was soon referred to as long-term potentiation (LTP). As a candidate mechanism for long-term memory, LTP has since been studied intensively, and a great deal has been learned about it. However, the complexity and variety of the intracellular signaling cascades that can trigger LTP is acknowledged as preventing a more complete understanding.

The hippocampus is a particularly favorable site for studying LTP because of its densely packed and sharply defined layers of neurons, but similar types of activity-dependent synaptic change have also been observed in many other brain areas. The best-studied form of LTP has been seen in CA1 of the hippocampus and occurs at synapses that terminate on dendritic spines and use the neurotransmitter glutamate.

The synaptic changes depend on the N-methyl-D-aspartate (NMDA) receptor, a cell surface receptor that allows calcium to enter the postsynaptic spine when glutamate and glycine are bound and postsynaptic depolarization occur at the same time. Drugs that interfere with NMDA receptors block LTP and have major effects on some types of memory, especially spatial memory. Genetically modified mice that are modified to disable the LTP mechanism also generally show severe memory deficits.

== Research ==
A brain implant for use as a hippocampal prosthesis has been the subject of research since the early 2000s. It was reported in 2018 that a nonlinear multi-input multi-output model (MIMO) had been developed that in some studies, had been shown to restore and improve memory function. This has been followed by a modified version known as the memory decoding model (MDM). This model has been shown to have the potential use in significant modification of memory. A study concluded that further research could be pointed towards an evaluation of both models, in particular focusing on the hippocampal theta wave input.

== Clinical significance ==
=== Aging ===
Normal aging is associated with a gradual decline in some types of memory, including episodic memory and working memory (or short-term memory). Because the hippocampus plays a central role in memory, there has been considerable interest in the possibility that age-related declines could be caused by hippocampal deterioration. Studies show that hippocampal volume loss is a noted feature from middle age, more so in women than in men. Where there is age-related shrinkage, memory performance will be impaired. There are also reports that memory tasks tend to produce less hippocampal activation in the elderly than in the young. Furthermore, a randomized control trial published in 2011 found that aerobic exercise could increase the size of the hippocampus in adults aged 55 to 80 and also improve spatial memory.

=== Alzheimer's disease ===
In Alzheimer's disease, (and other forms of dementia) the hippocampus is one of the first regions of the brain to be damaged; short-term memory loss and disorientation are included among the early symptoms. Amyloid beta deposits begin in the frontal lobes before the signs of neurofibrillary tangles are seen in the hippocampus.

Damage to the hippocampus can also result from oxygen starvation (hypoxia), encephalitis, or medial temporal lobe epilepsy. Extensive, bilateral hippocampal damage may cause anterograde amnesia: the inability to form and retain new memories.

Dementia is very often caused by cerebral ischemia that is believed to trigger changes in the hippocampus. Changes in CA1, the hippocampal area that underlies episodic memory, cause episodic memory impairment, the earliest symptom of post-ischemic dementia.

=== Stress ===
The hippocampus contains high levels of glucocorticoid receptors, which make it more vulnerable to long-term stress than most other brain areas. There is evidence that humans having experienced severe, long-lasting traumatic stress show atrophy of the hippocampus more than of other parts of the brain. These effects show up in post-traumatic stress disorder, and they may contribute to the hippocampal atrophy reported in schizophrenia and severe depression. Anterior hippocampal volume in children is positively correlated with parental family income and this correlation is thought to be mediated by income-related stress. A study has revealed atrophy as a result of depression, but this can be stopped with anti-depressants even if they are not effective in relieving other symptoms.

Chronic stress resulting in elevated levels of glucocorticoids, notably of cortisol, is seen to be a cause of neuronal atrophy in the hippocampus. This atrophy results in a smaller hippocampal volume which is also seen in Cushing's syndrome. The higher levels of cortisol in Cushing's syndrome is usually the result of medications taken for other conditions. Neuronal loss also occurs as a result of impaired neurogenesis. Another factor that contributes to a smaller hippocampal volume is that of dendritic retraction where dendrites are shortened in length and reduced in number, in response to increased glucocorticoids. This dendritic retraction is reversible. After treatment with medication to reduce cortisol in Cushing's syndrome, the hippocampal volume is seen to be restored by as much as 10%. This change is seen to be due to the reforming of the dendrites. This dendritic restoration can also happen when stress is removed. There is, however, evidence derived mainly from studies using rats that stress occurring shortly after birth can affect hippocampal function in ways that persist throughout life.

Sex-specific responses to stress have also been demonstrated in the rat to have an effect on the hippocampus. Chronic stress in the male rat showed dendritic retraction and cell loss in the CA3 region but this was not shown in the female. This was thought to be due to neuroprotective ovarian hormones. In rats, DNA damage increases in the hippocampus under conditions of stress.

==== PTSD ====
Some studies shows correlation of reduced hippocampus volume and post-traumatic stress disorder (PTSD). A study of Vietnam War combat veterans with PTSD showed a 20% reduction in the volume of their hippocampus compared with veterans with no such symptoms. This finding was not replicated in those with chronic PTSD, traumatized at an air show plane crash in 1988 (Ramstein, Germany). It is also the case that non-combat twin brothers of Vietnam veterans with PTSD also had smaller hippocampi than other controls, raising questions about the nature of the correlation. A 2016 study strengthened the theory that a smaller hippocampus increases the risk for post-traumatic stress disorder, and a larger hippocampus increases the likelihood of efficacious treatment.

==== Transient global amnesia ====
Transient global amnesia is a syndrome of unknown cause that results in a sudden and temporary anterograde amnesia and variable past memory loss. An attack usually lasts for up to 24 hours during which time the memory loss is experienced. The only diagnostic evidence of TGA is given by DWI-MRI that shows lesions as small dots in the CA1 subfield. The lesions are detectable from around 24 to 96 hours after symptoms onset, and can be seen to have been resolved at a six-month follow-up. The lesions are between 1 and 5 mm, and can be single or multiple and may be confined to either hemisphere. Lesions in the dominant hemisphere affect episodic verbal memory and those in the non-dominant hemisphere affect visuospatial memory.

CA1 lesions shows selective affect over other CA subfields. The selective vulnerability of CA1 neurons suggests a cause of metabolic stress that could result from emotional or behavioral stress. Other possible causes have been debated including cerebral venous reflex, arterial ischema, epilepsy, and migraine. TGA as a network disease has also been put forward; DTI studies show a decreased connectivity between brain regions that may impact the hippocampus.

=== Epilepsy ===
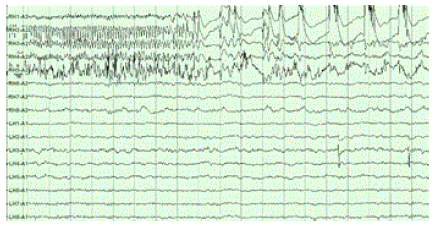
An EEG showing epilepsy right-hippocampal seizure onset

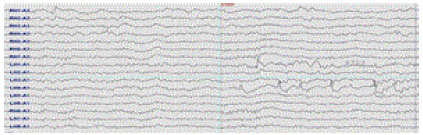
An EEG showing epilepsy left-hippocampal seizure onset

The hippocampus is one of the few brain regions where new neurons are generated. This process of neurogenesis is confined to the dentate gyrus. Neurogenesis can be positively affected by exercise or negatively affected by epileptic seizures.

Seizures in temporal lobe epilepsy can affect the normal development of new neurons and can cause tissue damage. Hippocampal sclerosis specific to the mesial temporal lobe, is the most common type of such tissue damage. It is not yet clear, however, whether the epilepsy is usually caused by hippocampal abnormalities or whether the hippocampus is damaged by cumulative effects of seizures. However, in experimental settings where repetitive seizures are artificially induced in animals, hippocampal damage is a frequent result. This may be a consequence of the concentration of excitable glutamate receptors in the hippocampus. Hyperexcitability can lead to cytotoxicity and cell death. It may also have something to do with the hippocampus being a site of continuous neurogenesis, and to abnormalities in this process.

=== Schizophrenia ===
A reduction in hippocampal volume is well reported in those with schizophrenia. The left hippocampus seems to be affected more than the right. The volume reduction is small but consistent, it can be first seen in the prodromal stage, and can show modest progression as the disease advances. The reduced volume has been shown to be independent of treatment with antipsychotics. Some studies suggest that hippocampal alterations play a role in causing the psychotic symptoms of schizophrenia. It has been suggested that hippocampal dysfunction might produce an alteration of dopamine release in the basal ganglia, thereby indirectly affecting the integration of information in the prefrontal cortex.

In those with psychosis the greatest reduction is seen to be in CA3 and CA2 subfields, and a correlation has been made between the reduced volume and memory dysfunction. A reduced hippocampal volume has been shown to result in a decreased connectivity between the hippocampus and the prefrontal cortex, with the declarative memory characteristic of hippocampal function becoming selectively impaired. The impaired connectivity is evident both at rest and during task-activity.

Evidence of dysfunctional GABA (inhibitory) transmission has been shown in studies of the whole hippocampus. Another noted change in the hippocampus is a reduced M4 muscarinic cholinergic receptor, but an unaffected M1 receptor. Reduced neurogenesis has been shown in the dentate gyrus with a noted reduction in the density of neurons and oligodendrocytes.

Hyperactivity in the hippocampus has consistently been linked to schizophrenia using blood-oxygenation-level–dependent imaging in functional MRI, and in cerebral blood volume studies. The CA1 subfield is mostly indicated to be affected, and hyperactivity almost exclusively found in the anterior hippocampus. Hippocampal hyperactivity has been suggested to be a result of dysfunctional GABAergic inhibition. It has been suggested that hippocampal hyperactivity at early stages of schizophrenia may contribute, by excitotoxic mechanisms, to hippocampal atrophy and volume reduction at later stages of the disorder. Hippocampal hyperactivity has been suggested to contribute to symptoms of schizophrenia, including those of psychosis.

=== Microcephaly ===
Hippocampus atrophy has been characterized in those with microcephaly. Mouse models with Wdr62 mutations which recapitulate human point mutations show a deficiency in hippocampal development, and neurogenesis.

== Other animals ==
=== Other vertebrates ===
Non-mammalian vertebrates lack a brain structure that looks like the mammalian hippocampus, but they have one that is considered homologous to it. The hippocampus is in essence part of the allocortex. Only mammals have a fully developed cortex, but the structure it evolved from, called the pallium, is present in all vertebrates, even the most primitive ones such as the lamprey or hagfish. The pallium is usually divided into three zones: medial, lateral and dorsal. The medial pallium forms the precursor of the hippocampus. It does not resemble the hippocampus visually because the layers are not warped into an S shape or enfolded by the dentate gyrus, but the homology is indicated by strong chemical and functional affinities. There is evidence that these hippocampal-like structures are involved in spatial cognition in reptiles, and in fish.

==== Fish ====
In teleost fish, the forebrain is everted (like an inside-out sock) with structures that lie on the outside, as contrasted with other vertebrate structures that lie in the interior, next to the ventricles. One of the consequences of this is that the medial pallium, the hippocampal zone of a typical vertebrate, is thought to correspond to the lateral pallium of a typical fish. Several types of fish (particularly goldfish) have been shown experimentally to have strong spatial memory abilities, even forming cognitive maps of the areas they inhabit. Studies in goldfish show that damage to both the lateral pallium, and the medial pallium impairs spatial memory coding. It is not clear if the medial pallium plays a similar role in basal vertebrates, such as sharks and rays, or even lampreys and hagfish. The dorsolateral pallium of the teleost is considered as homologous to the hippocampus in terrestrial vertebrates. In 2023, the goldfish brain was mapped by molecular parcellization showing that its telencephalon subregions were homogeneous to the hippocampal subfields in the mouse.

==== Birds ====
In birds, the correspondence is sufficiently well established that most anatomists refer to the medial pallial zone as the "avian hippocampus". Numerous species of birds have strong spatial skills, in particular those that cache (store) food. There is evidence that food-caching birds have a larger hippocampus than other types of birds and that damage to the hippocampus causes impairments in spatial memory.

=== Insects and molluscs ===
Some types of insects such as cockroaches, and molluscs such as the octopus, also have strong spatial learning and navigation abilities, but these appear to work differently from the mammalian spatial system, suggesting that there is no common evolutionary origin. Mushroom bodies in insect brains are associated with learning and memory carried out in the mammalian hippocampus. The brain of the octopus is arranged in a circle of lobes around the esophagus. The vertical lobe has been shown to be involved in forming long term memory, and is seen to be analogous to the mammalian hippocampus and cerebellum, and also to share some functional features of the mushroom bodies in insects.

== See also ==
- Visual short-term memory

== Additional images ==
Hippocampus highlighted in green on coronal T1 MRI images

Hippocampus highlighted in green on sagittal T1 MRI images

Hippocampus highlighted in green on transversal T1 MRI images
