= Fornix (neuroanatomy) =

Bundle of nerve fibers in the brain

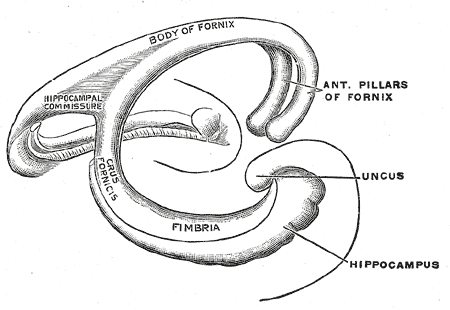
- Diagram of the fornix. Right=anterior

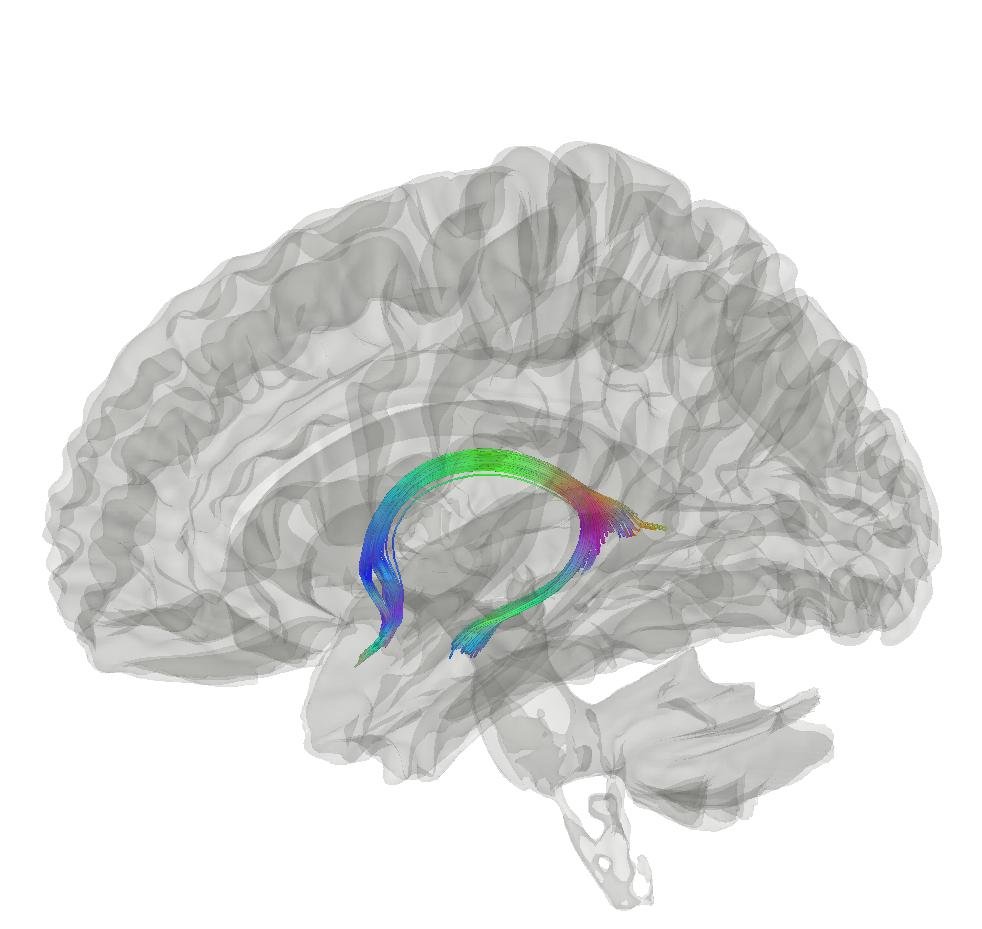
- Tractography showing fornix

Details
- Artery: Small medial central branches of the anterior communicating artery

Identifiers
- Latin: fornix
- MeSH: D020712
- NeuroNames: 268
- NeuroLex ID: birnlex_705
- TA98: A14.1.08.949; A14.1.09.255
- TA2: 5633
- FMA: 61965

In the human brain, the fornix (from Latin: fornix, lit. 'arch'; pl.: fornices) is a C-shaped bundle of nerve fibers that acts as the major output tract of the hippocampus. The fornix also carries some afferent fibers to the hippocampus from structures in the diencephalon and basal forebrain. The fornix is part of the limbic system. While its exact function and importance in the physiology of the brain are still not entirely clear, it has been demonstrated in humans that surgical transection—the cutting of the fornix along its body—can cause memory loss. There is some debate over what type of memory is affected by this damage, but it has been found to most closely correlate with recall memory rather than recognition memory. This means that damage to the fornix can cause difficulty in recalling long-term information such as details of past events, but it has little effect on the ability to recognize objects or familiar situations.

== Structure ==
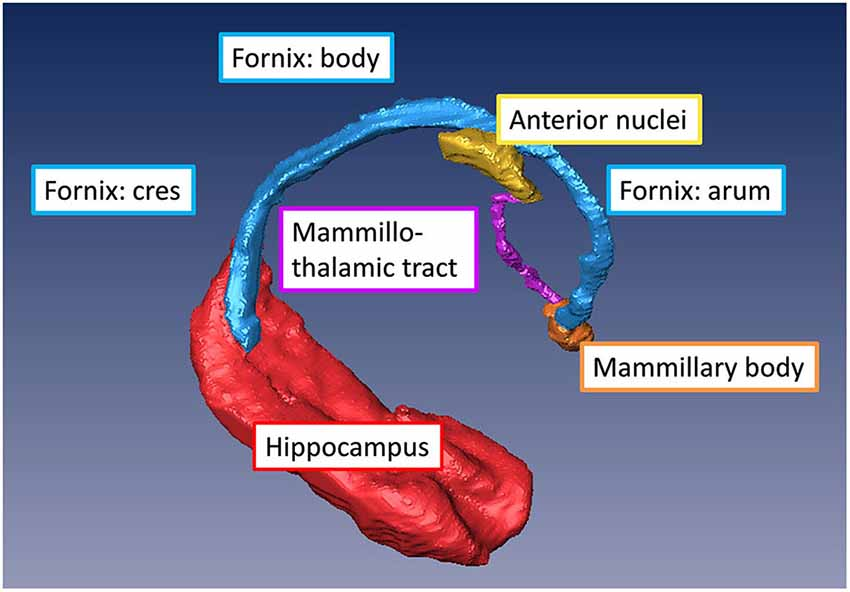
Fornix as one of the limbic structures.

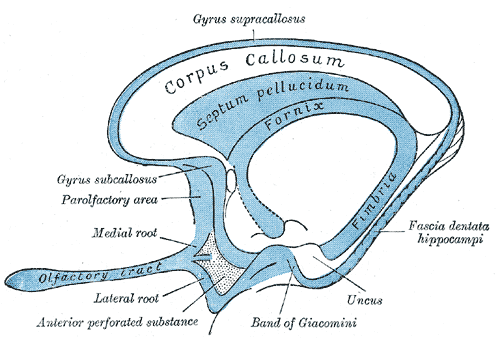
Scheme of rhinencephalon

The fornix is a white matter tract of the brain that connects the hippocampus with other brain regions. It consists of the fimbria, crura, body, and columns, with the two crura joining to form the body of the fornix.

The body of the fornix travels anteriorly and divides again near the anterior commissure. The left and right parts separate, but there is also an anterior/posterior divergence.

- The posterior fibers (called the postcommissural fornix) of each side continue through the hypothalamus to the mammillary bodies; then to the anterior nuclei of thalamus via the mammillothalamic tract.
- The anterior fibers (precommissural fornix) end at the septal nuclei of the basal forebrain and nucleus accumbens of each half of the brain.

=== Commissure ===
The medial portions of the body of the fornix are joined by a thin triangular lamina, named the psalterium (lyra). This lamina contains some commissural fibers that connect the two hippocampi across the middle line and constitute the commissure of fornix (also called the hippocampal commissure).

The terminal lamina creates the commissure plate. This structure gives existence to the corpus callosum, the septum pellucidum, and the fornix. The fornix splits into two columns at the front (anterior pillars), and then splits into two posterior crura. These two crura are joined together through the hippocampal commissure. The beginning of the splitting is called the psalterium or Lyra Davidis. The latter name is used because the structure resembles a lyra (or triangular harp): The two crura are the "chassis" of the lyra, and the commissure connections are the fibers.

=== Columns ===
The columns (anterior pillars; fornicolumns) of the fornix arch downward in front of the interventricular foramina and behind the anterior commissure, and each descends through the grey matter in the lateral wall of the third ventricle to the base of the brain, where it ends in the mammillary bodies.

=== Crus ===
The crura (posterior pillars) of the fornix are prolonged backward from the body.

They are flattened bands, and, at their commencement, are intimately connected with the under surface of the corpus callosum.

Diverging from one another, each curves around the posterior end of the thalamus, and passes downward and forward into the temporal horn of lateral ventricle.

Here, it lies along the concavity of the hippocampus, on the surface of which some of its fibers are spread out to form the alveus, while the remainder is continued as a narrow white band, the fimbria of hippocampus, which is prolonged into the uncus of the parahippocampal gyrus.

== Functional consequences of fornix damage ==
The fornix is essential for acquiring and consolidating new episodic memories. Fornix transection studies in macaques have shown that the monkeys were strongly impaired on object-in-scene learning, which is a type of recall memory, specifically episodic-like memory (integrating what and where, although not when). Fornix transection in rodents impairs performance on tasks that require the encoding and retrieval of spatiotemporal context and, therefore, serves as a proxy for human episodic memory. For instance, fornix transection consistently leads to robust impairments in learning new routes and spatial locations.

Fornix damage in humans is rare; a few individuals have had their fornix transected inadvertently during removal of colloid cysts from their third ventricles. Nevertheless this small literature has consistently reported a persistent anterograde amnesia that is indistinguishable from the anterograde amnesia observed after focal hippocampal lesions. Deficits in recall are greater than for recognition, and the deficit is found across all types of material (e.g. visual and verbal). This supports the idea that damage to any part of the extended hippocampal memory system causes similar memory deficits. Other aspects of cognition, such as social cognition and language ability, remain intact after fornix damage.

Lesion findings have been extended by work using the non-invasive in vivo technique diffusion-weighted imaging. This literature has shown that fractional anisotropy (FA) in the fornix decreases with advanced age, correlates with age-related memory impairments, and is relatively decreased in mild cognitive impairment and in Alzheimer's disease. New research studies are using deep brain stimulation to stimulate the fornix as some evidence has shown that doing so improves episodic memory.

== Function ==
The fornix is the conduit by which the neurotransmitter acetylcholine – which is crucial for memory encoding – is sent from the medial septum/Diagonal band of Broca to the hippocampus. In addition, the GABA-producing neurons in the septal nuclei generate theta rhythms which are transmitted through the fornix to the hippocampus. In the absence of these external modulators, the hippocampus is radically dysfunctional. In addition, the fornix transmits mnemonic information from the hippocampus to deep brain structures, which potentially allows us to use stored memories to guide us to rewarding people, places, and sources of sustenance.

== Additional images ==
Fornix (animation)

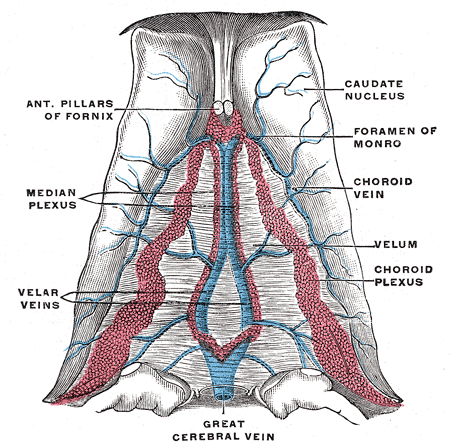
Velum interpositum

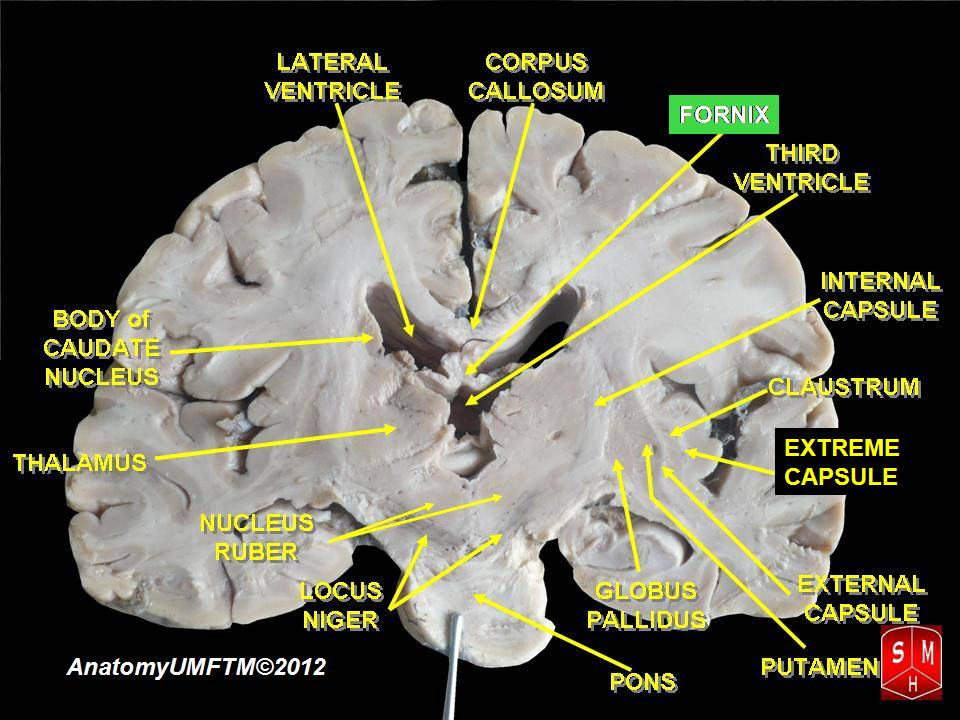
Fornix

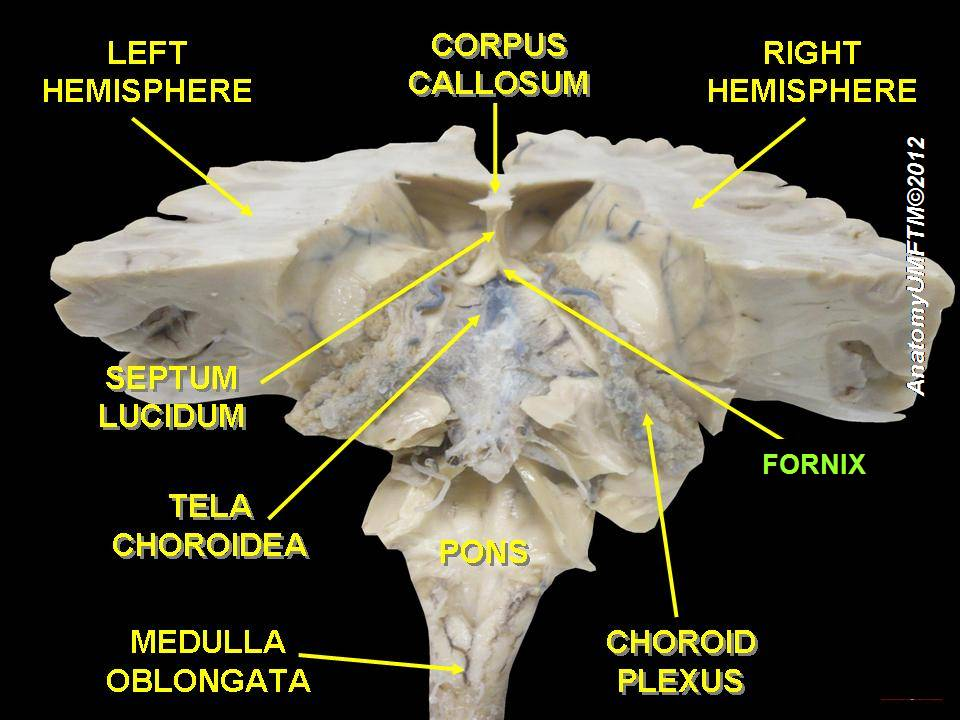
Fornix
