= Diagonal band of Broca =

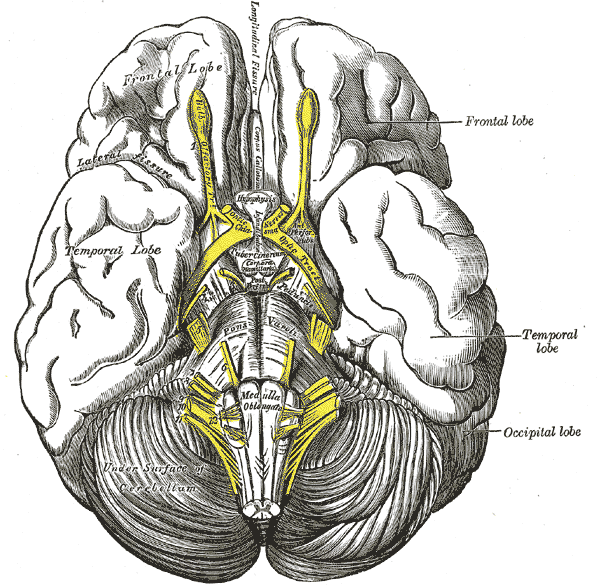
- Base of brain. (Diagonal band of Broca not labeled, but anterior perforated substance labeled at center.)

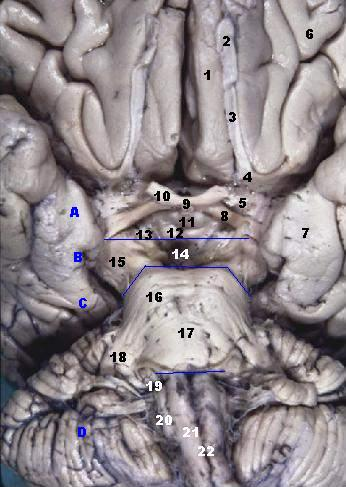
- Human brainstem, anterior view. (Diagonal band of Broca not labeled, but anterior perforated substance is #5.)

Details

Identifiers
- Latin: stria diagonalis
- MeSH: D020667
- NeuroNames: 285
- NeuroLex ID: birnlex_1551
- TA98: A14.1.09.422
- TA2: 5547
- FMA: 61973

The diagonal band of Broca interconnects the amygdala and the septal area. It is one of the olfactory structures. It is situated upon the inferior aspect of the brain. It forms the medial margin of the anterior perforated substance.

It was described by the French neuroanatomist Paul Broca.

== Structure ==
It consists of fibers that are said to arise in the parolfactory area, the gyrus subcallosus and the anterior perforated substance, and course backward in the longitudinal striae to the dentate gyrus and the hippocampal region.

This is a cholinergic bundle of nerve fibers posterior to the anterior perforated substance. It interconnects the subcallosal gyrus in the septal area with the hippocampus and lateral olfactory area.

=== Nuclei ===
Two structures are often described in this brain regions, namely the nuclei of the vertical and horizontal limbs of the diagonal band of Broca (nvlDBB and nhlDBB, respectively). nvlDBB projects to the hippocampal formation through the fornix and it is the second largest assembly of cholinergic neurons in the basal forebrain whereas nhlDBB projects to the olfactory bulb and it does not have a significant population of cholinergic neurons.

=== Development ===
It is one of the basal forebrain structures that are derived from the ventral telencephalon during development.

== Function ==
Along with the septum pellucidum and medial septal nucleus, the diagonal band of Broca is believed to be involved in the generation of theta waves in the hippocampus. It also inhibits magnocellular neurosecretory cells via GABA interneurons.

Its behavior can be altered by nerve growth factor.

== Pathology ==
A significant nvlDBB neuronal loss is seen in Lewy body dementia.
