= Supramammillary nucleus =

The supramammillary nucleus (SuM), or supramammillary area, is a thin layer of cells in the brain that lies above the mammillary bodies. It can be considered part of the hypothalamus and diencephalon. The nucleus can be divided into medial and lateral sections. The medial SuM, or SuM_{M}, is made of smaller cells which release dopamine and give input to the lateral septal nucleus. The lateral SuM, or SuM_{L}, is made of larger cells that project to the hippocampus.

== Functions ==
Although the exact function of the supramammillary nucleus is still not clear, it is known that the SuM plays a role in modulating theta frequencies. Because of its role in modulating hippocampal theta, it is implicated in spatial and emotional memory formation. The axons of SuM neurons make monosynaptic connections to granule cells and GABAergic interneurons in the dentate gyrus. The SuM projects its afferent signals exclusively to the dentate gyrus and CA2 region of the hippocampus. These SuM neurons will co-release glutamate and GABA, but these inputs will not fully excite the granule cells. Although it will not cause an action potential alone, SuM neurons can have excitatory impact on granule cells with the help of perforant path inputs. The perforant pathway are fibers that connect the entorhinal cortex with the hippocampus. This pathway accounts for the major inputs to the hippocampus and dentate gyrus. Ultimately, the SuM will modulate the granule cell outputs causing it to influence the dentate gyrus information processing.
