= Olfactory imprinting in sheep =

Imprinting is most often used to describe an early-life bond that can later affect an animal's mate choice. More broadly, the term refers to a rapid and selective learning process that only can occur during certain times in an animal's life. In sheep, ewes having just given birth imprint onto their lambs on the basis of olfactory cues, allowing mothers to distinguish their own offspring from other lambs in the flock. This olfactory-based imprinting is dependent on a ewe's behavior after giving birth, on the presence of amniotic fluid, and on a specialized odor-influenced learning process which allows the ewe to quickly memorize the smell of her offspring, to whom she then forms an exclusive maternal bond.

== Bonding and selective attachment ==
Some species of mammals show selective maternal bond between mother and infant. This type of bonding is characterized by an exclusive relationship; selective mothers will not provide maternal care to young with which they have not formed a bond.

Domesticated sheep, Ovis aries, are one such mammal, forming a strong and exclusive bond with their young. In sheep, olfaction, the sense of smell, plays a vital role in the establishment of the exclusive bond, though other senses, particularly sight and to an extent hearing, are involved as well. This bonding process appears to operate in the same fashion in wild and feral sheep populations (Genus Ovis, various species) as in domesticated breeds, though wild and feral populations have received less study.

Sheep are ideal for studying attachment because there are ethical and logistic difficulties that limit laboratory and research use of most other species known to develop selective mother-young social relationships, namely seals, primates, and other ungulates. Additionally, domestic sheep are common worldwide, easily bred and handled, and well understood in terms of behavior and natural history, providing a solid base for more intricate study. Olfaction plays a role in responsiveness, as most non-maternal animals find the smell of infants and amniotic fluid repulsive, while in maternal animals, those with the appropriate hormone profiles, these same smells increase maternal responsiveness.

Maternal care is rarely selective, particularly outside of ruminant species. Most animals displaying maternal instincts will care for any infant introduced to the nest. In contrast to this, selective mothers form bonds to specific individual young and will show maternal responsiveness only to these young. In sheep, young to whom the ewe is not maternally bonded will be received with aggression, generally head-butting and turning in circles away from the lamb. Another feature of this maternally selective bond is that it is difficult to break, and very difficult to establish new bonds outside of the period immediately surrounding parturition.

== Behavioral ecology ==
In natural populations, selective attachment in parenting appears to emerge as a result of the combination of the mobility of the offspring and the social structure of the species. Natural selection is assumed to favor the evolution of mechanisms ensuring that the correct offspring receive the (often costly) parental investment involved in rearing. Sheep are fully mobile shortly after birth and young are likely to mix with unrelated offspring at an early age due to the flock social structure, so the ability to identify and preferentially interact with one's own offspring is crucial for the correct allocation of maternal resources, principally milk. This is commonly seen in other ungulates and also in seals and primates, all species where the chance of misdirecting parental care is substantial.

== Maternal care: Responsiveness and selectivity ==
Maternal care in sheep can be seen as composed of two components – selectivity and responsiveness. Maternal responsiveness can be observed broadly across species, mammalian and otherwise. This is the drive for a mother to provide care for her young. Maternal responsiveness in sheep is characterized by allowing lambs to nurse, by an absence of aggressive behavior, anxiety upon removal of their young and by low-pitched, close-mouthed vocalizations or “rumbles”. These rumbles calm and quiet the lamb, and serve as an auditory signature as the lamb ages, a cue by which lambs can identify their own mothers. Olfaction plays a role in responsiveness, as most non-maternal animals find the smell of infants and amniotic fluid repellant, while in maternal animals, those with the hormone profiles which occur in late pregnancy, these same smells increase maternal responsiveness.

Maternal care is rarely selective, particularly outside of ruminant species. Most animals displaying maternal instincts will care for any infant introduced to the nest. In contrast to this, selective mothers form bonds to specific individual young and will show maternal responsiveness only to these young. In sheep, young to whom the ewe is not maternally bonded will be received with aggression, generally head-butting and turning in circles away from the lamb. Another feature of this maternally selective bond is that it is difficult to break, and very difficult to establish new bonds outside of the period immediately surrounding parturition.

== Behaviors important for olfactory imprinting ==
The expression of maternal behavior in sheep follows a fairly rigid pattern in the period leading up to and following birth, a large part of which involves licking and sniffing. These licking and sniffing behaviors expose the ewe to the smell of the lamb and the amniotic fluid in which it is covered. During the period leading up to parturition, ewes will display maternal responsiveness and an attraction to amniotic fluid. After giving birth, the ewe will lick her lambs clean of fluid and membranes. Only a few minutes of this licking behavior is required for some ewes to butt away a foreign lamb, and most will show selectivity and aggression toward foreign lambs within 2 to 4 hours, but complete selectivity can take around 24 hours to develop.

== The role of amniotic fluid ==
The presence of amniotic fluid is important for proper acceptance and selective bonding. It is not only the natural smell of the lamb that elicits maternal response and moves forward the bonding process, but the smell of the amniotic fluid as well. In this way, amniotic fluid plays a dual function, with a role in both the development of responsiveness and selectivity. The presence of amniotic fluid is particularly important for ewes with no maternal experience. If a lamb that has been washed with water is presented to an inexperienced ewe, the ewe will not accept the lamb at her udder and will display aggressive behaviors toward the lamb. This can also occur with washed lambs and experienced dams, but the occurrence is not as reliable.

Ewes will generally display stronger attraction to their own amniotic fluid than to that of another ewe, though they will display some attraction to the amniotic fluid of any animal of their own species. If a dry alien lamb is smeared with amniotic fluid, an ewe presented with that lamb is more likely to display aggressive behavior if the lamb is smeared with the amniotic fluid of an alien ewe, compared to if it is smeared with that ewe's own fluid. It has been speculated that this is due to some olfactory signature of the ewe's amniotic fluid, though whether this is a response innate to the ewe or a result of her exposure to and ingestion of amniotic fluid from the ground after rupture of the water bag.

The attraction to amniotic fluid is important during the period of time before the ewe has developed selectivity; the presence of amniotic fluid appears to play a role in the development of this selectivity as well. It was found that depriving newly lambed ewes of access to amniotic fluid during the first 4 hours after giving birth had significant consequences on maternal selectivity as well as responsiveness. The effect on responsiveness appear more severe, with nearly 50% of ewes in one experiment rejecting their own lambs when completely deprived of exposure to amniotic fluid. In those that did accept their own lamb, if their lamb was washed, they were more likely to also accept a washed alien lamb; an ewe's discrimination ability without the presence of amniotic fluid appears to be reduced. The effect of amniotic fluid deprivation appears to come from a combination of the decreased maternal attention paid to an unwashed lamb and the lessened olfactory cues to which the mother can have access through licking.

== Involvement of the primary and/or secondary olfactory systems ==
When lambs and their mothers are physically separated by distance, but the lambs remain unwashed and coated in amniotic fluid, neither the ewe's acceptance of her lamb nor her selectivity against alien lambs was affected. This result supports the fairly well established idea that the compounds in amniotic fluid are volatile and perceived by olfaction. A series of studies in which ewes have been rendered anosmic, or incapable of smell, provide evidence for this. However, whether the primary olfactory system, the accessory olfactory system or both are responsible for the establishment of these responsive and selective maternal behaviors remains somewhat unclear.

In one 2006 study, ewes whose primary olfactory systems were incapacitated by nasal irrigation with zinc-sulfate procaine solution displayed rejection behaviors toward foreign lambs to the same degree as did control ewes. Ewes whose vomeronasal organs were rendered non-functional by electro-cauterization failed to reject alien lambs at the udder, and were noted to perform more maternal flehmens, a behavior related to vomeronasal activity. The lack of vomeronasal function was confirmed based on the formation of complete mucosal scarring over both oral and nasal openings of the nasoincisive duct. This suggests that the vomeronasal organ plays an active role in maternal identification of the lamb at the udder.

In contrast, a 1995 study examined ewes under a very similar setup, with different results. Ewes were made anosmic by irrigation of the nostrils with a zinc sulfate and procaine solution. For the group in which vomeronasal perception was rendered inactive, the vomeronasal nerves only were severed; this was later confirmed by use of both an anterograde tracer and postmortem examination of the accessory olfactory bulb. This experiment found that vomeronasal-lesioned animals showed little difference from controls in both responsiveness and selectivity. The ewes whose primary olfactory system was disabled were impaired in responsiveness if they were inexperienced, showing a delay in maternal responsiveness, which was not seen in experienced ewes. In both inexperienced and experienced ewes, selective behavior was disrupted.

One study sought to examine compounds in lamb wool that could contribute to this individual olfactory signature. While a number of compounds were isolated, a synthetic reproduction of these substances was not sufficient to “trick” a ewe into accepting an alien lamb.

== Neurobiological underpinnings ==
The mechanical stimulation of the ewe's vagina and cervix by expulsion of the fetus induces a neural release of oxytocin in the paraventricular nucleus of the hypothalamus, as well as in the bed nucleus of the stria terminalis, medial preoptic area and the olfactory bulb. It appears that this oxytocin release indirectly primes the main olfactory bulb such that this region may optimally respond to cues from the newborn lamb.

The ewe's learning of her lamb's odor involves synaptic changes within the olfactory bulb. Electrophysiological recordings from olfactory bulb mitral cells of a recently lambed ewe show these cells respond preferentially to general lamb odors, and a subset respond preferentially to the odor of a ewe's own lamb. These mitral cells become increasingly responsive to the learned odor, and this increased response stimulates increased release of glutamate and GABA between these excitatory mitral cells and inhibitory granule cells.

Pharmacological studies using the centrally acting muscarinic antagonist scopolamine inhibited lamb recognition, which may be due to a blockade of muscarinic receptors in projection areas of basal forebrain cholinergic neurons. It has been suggested that olfactory recognition of the lamb could be dependent on cholinergic neurons of the horizontal limb of the diagonal band of Broca projecting to olfactory targets. This does appear to be the case, as lesions of the nucleus basalis did severely impair olfactory recognition of the lamb – these ewes were not selective against foreign lambs, nor were they as apt at identifying their own lamb.

Additional olfactory structures for which there is evidence for action on the establishment and display of maternal selectivity include the secondary and tertiary olfactory processing regions (piriform cortex, medial and cortical nuclei of the amygdala; orbitofrontal and frontal medial cortex, and entorhinal cortex).
