= Indusium griseum =

Membraneous layer of grey matter in the brain

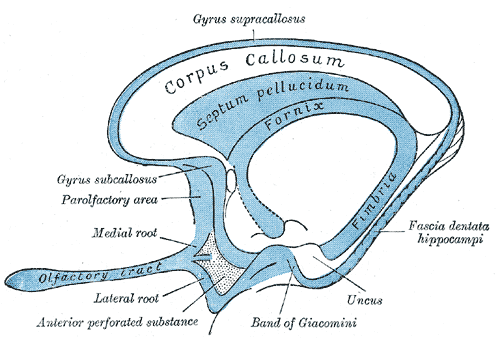
- Scheme of rhinencephalon. (Indusium griseum labelled as gyrus supracallosus at center top.)

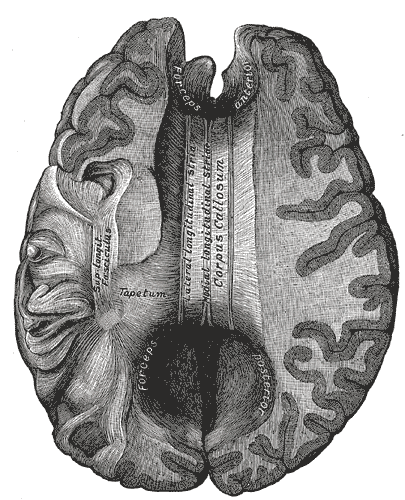
- Corpus callosum from above.

Identifiers
- NeuroNames: 173
- NeuroLex ID: birnlex_1316
- TA98: A14.1.09.246
- TA2: 5526
- FMA: 62488

The indusium griseum, (supracallosal gyrus, gyrus epicallosus, dorsal hippocampal continuation) consists of a thin membranous layer of grey matter in contact with the upper surface of the corpus callosum and continuous laterally with the grey matter of the cingulate cortex and inferiorly with the hippocampus. It is vestigial in humans and is a remnant of the former position of the hippocampus in lower animals.

On either side of the midline of the indusium griseum are two ridges formed by bands of longitudinally directed fibers known as the medial and lateral longitudinal striae.

The indusium griseum is prolonged around the splenium of the corpus callosum as a delicate layer, the fasciolar gyrus, (also gyrus fasciolaris) which is continuous below with the surface of the dentate gyrus. The indusium griseum and fasciolar gyrus are very small components of the limbic lobe, and are continuations of the hippocampal formation, forming an unremarkable thin continuous ring of grey matter at the edge of the cortex.

Toward the genu of the corpus callosum it curves down along the rostrum to form the subcallosal gyrus.
