= Longitudinal striae =

Nerve fibres along the corpus callosum

Details

Identifiers
- Latin: stria longitudinalis medialis, stria longitudinalis lateralis
- NeuroNames: 175
- TA98: A14.1.09.248; A14.1.09.247
- TA2: 5590, 5591
- FMA: 67956

In human neuroanatomy, the longitudinal striae (also striae lancisi or nerves of Lancisi) are two bundles of fibres embedded in the indusium griseum running along the corpus callosum of the brain. They were originally described by Italian physician, epidemiologist and anatomist Giovanni Maria Lancisi. The striae are categorized as medial longitudinal stria and lateral longitudinal stria; the area between the striae is a useful neurosurgical mark of the middle of the corpus callosum.

After the indisium griseum curves along the rostrum of the corpus callosum the combined striae continue toward the amygdala as part of the diagonal band of Broca.
