= Subcallosal area =

Part of limbic system

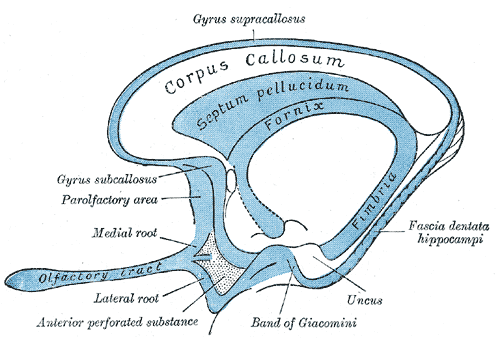
- Scheme of rhinencephalon. (Paraolfactory area labeled at center left.)

- Medial surface of left cerebral hemisphere. (Paraolfactory area labeled at center right.)

Details

Identifiers
- Latin: area subcallosa, area parolfactoria
- NeuroNames: 278
- NeuroLex ID: birnlex_919
- TA98: A14.1.09.211
- TA2: 5509
- FMA: 61890

The subcallosal area (parolfactory area of Broca) is a small triangular field on the medial surface of the hemisphere in front of the subcallosal gyrus, from which it is separated by the posterior parolfactory sulcus. It is continuous below with the olfactory trigone, and above and in front with the cingulate gyrus, and is limited anteriorly by the anterior parolfactory sulcus.

The subcallosal area is also known as "Zuckerkandl's gyrus", for Emil Zuckerkandl.

The parahippocampal gyrus, subcallosal area, and cingulate gyrus have been described together as the periarcheocortex.

The "subcallosal area" and "parolfactory area" are considered equivalent in BrainInfo, but in Terminologia Anatomica they are considered distinct structures.

== Additional images ==
3D view of the subcallosal area in an average human brain
