= Subcallosal gyrus =

Part of limbic system

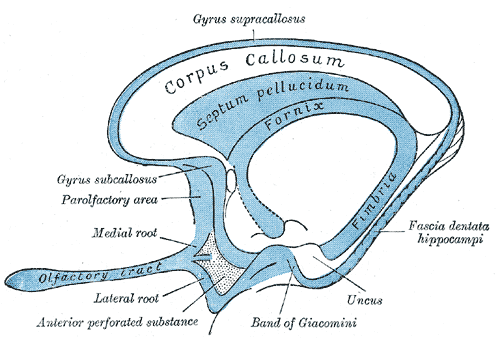
- Scheme of rhinencephalon. (Gyrus subcallosus labeled at center left.)

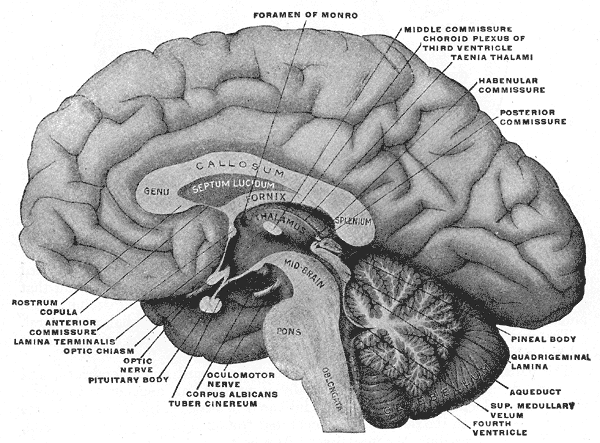
- Mesal aspect of a brain sectioned in the median sagittal plane. (Rostrum labeled at center left, and subcallosal gyrus is adjacent to rostrum.)

Details

Identifiers
- Latin: Gyrus subcallosus,
- NeuroNames: 171
- NeuroLex ID: birnlex_1138
- TA98: A14.1.09.212
- TA2: 5517
- FMA: 61919

The subcallosal gyrus (paraterminal gyrus, peduncle of the corpus callosum) is a narrow lamina on the medial surface of the hemisphere in front of the lamina terminalis, behind the parolfactory area, and below the rostrum of the corpus callosum. It is continuous around the genu of the corpus callosum with the indusium griseum. It is also considered a part of limbic system of the brain.
