= Septal area =

Area in the frontal lobe of the brain

- Lateral and medial septal nuclei in the septal area of the mouse brain

Details

Identifiers
- Latin: nuclei septales
- MeSH: D012686
- NeuroNames: 259
- TA98: A14.1.09.266
- TA2: 5548
- FMA: 61845

The septal area (medial olfactory area) is an area in the lower, posterior part of the medial surface of the frontal lobe, and refers to the nearby septum pellucidum. It consists of the lateral septum and medial septum.

The septal nuclei are located in this area. The septal nuclei are composed of medium-size neurons which are classified into dorsal, ventral, medial, and caudal groups. The septal nuclei receive reciprocal connections from the olfactory bulb, hippocampus, amygdala, hypothalamus, midbrain, habenula, cingulate gyrus, and thalamus. The septal nuclei are essential in generating the theta rhythm of the hippocampus.

The septal area (medial olfactory area) has no relation to the sense of smell, but it is considered a pleasure zone in animals. The septal nuclei play a role in reward and reinforcement along with the nucleus accumbens. In the 1950s, Olds & Milner showed that rats with electrodes implanted in this area will self-stimulate repeatedly (e.g., press a bar to receive electric current that stimulate the neurons). Experiments on the septal area of humans have taken place since the 1960s.

== Connections ==
The septal area is located on the lower posterior part of the frontal lobe. The septal area refers to the nearby septum pellucidum. It is located underneath the corpus callosum and in front of the lamina terminalis. The lamina terminalis is a layer of gray matter that connects the optic chiasma and the anterior commissure. The septal nuclei in the septal area are essential in generating the theta rhythm of the hippocampus.

The dorsal septum projects to the lateral preoptic area, lateral hypothalamus, periventricular hypothalamus and midline thalamus.

Fibers from the ventral half of the septum project topographically to the hippocampal formation, thalamus, hypothalamus and midbrain. Specifically, neurons located along the midline in the vertical limb of the diagonal band of Broca project through the dorsal fornix to all CA fields of the dorsal hippocampus and adjacent subicular cortex. Other fibers from this region project through the stria medullaris to the medial and lateral habenular nuclei, the paratenial and anteromedial nucleus of the thalamus, and through the medial forebrain bundle to the pars posterior of the medial mammillary nucleus.

Cells located in the intermediolateral septum also project through the lateral part of the fimbria to all CA fields of the ventral hippocampus and adjacent subicular and entorhinal cortices. These cells also send fibers through the stria medullaris to the lateral habenular nucleus and mediodorsal thalamic nucleus. Other axons arising from these cells descend through the medial forebrain bundle to terminate in a region dorsal to the interpeduncular nucleus.

The lateral septum is a relay center for connections from the CA3 of the hippocampus to the ventral tegmental area. These connections help link reward signals with the context in which they occur.

Fibers from the most lateral part of the ventral septum (i.e., bed nucleus of the anterior commissure) project through the stria terminalis to the ventral subiculum. In addition, cells located in the horizontal limb of the diagonal band project massively to the pars posterior of the medial mammillary nucleus, the ventral tegmental area, and amygdala.

== Functions of the lateral septum ==
=== The lateral septum and movement and reward ===
The lateral septum is involved in a variety of functions, including emotional, motivational, and spatial behavior. It has been suggested that the LS may regulate interactions between the hippocampus and other regions that mediate goal directed behavior, such as the ventral tegmental area. Firing of LS neurons is modulated by both speed and acceleration and spatial location, and that firing is also related to reward and context. It has thus been suggested that the lateral septum may incorporate movement into the evaluation of environmental context with respect to motivation and reward.

=== Lateral septum and social behavior ===
Inhibitory GABA, and excitatory glutamate, which regulate lateral septum (LS) activity, have been found to be increased during social play in juvenile rats. No sex differences were found in extracellular GABA concentrations during social playing, however, glutamate plays a major role in female social playing. When glutamate receptors are blocked in the LS pharmacologically, there is a significant decrease in female social playing, while males had no decrease in playing. This suggests that in the lateral septum, GABA neurotransmission is involved in social play behavior regulation in both sexes, while glutamate neurotransmission is sex-specific, involved in regulation of social play only in female juvenile rats.

=== Lateral septum and reproduction ===
Experiments have shown that both testosterone and dihydrotestosterone, when implanted directly into the lateral septum of male rats, caused a significant rise in serum LH and FSH levels, while not significantly increasing serum testosterone and dihydrotestosterone levels respectively. This indicates that the effect is occurring through testosterone receptors and independently of conversion to estrogen via aromatization. As of now, it is unclear, what exact pathway is mediating this phenomenon. Septal lesions significantly decreased serum LH and testosterone levels in male rats, while FSH and prolactin production were unaffected by the surgery. Electrical stimulation of the septum induced the elevation of serum LH and FSH levels. These data suggest that the lateral and/or the medial septum may play a role in the control of GnRH/gonadotropin secretion, and thus, the reproductive axis.

=== Lateral septum and memory ===
Despite the diverse direct projection system between the hippocampus and the lateral septum, the first pieces of evidence regarding the role of latter brain area in memory formation and retention have only started to emerge as of 2022. However, recent research has started to shed light on the potentially diverse roles of the lateral septum.

==== Social memory ====
The roles of the lateral septum in formation of social memories remain unclear and controversial. It is clear, that some role is being played, as oxytocin and vasopressin, when administered into the lateral septum after social training were able to enhance memory formation, while their respective receptor blockers had the opposite effect. However, data on effects of pre-training administration of these compounds is mixed, hence the lack of consensus.

==== Fear memory ====
Pieces of evidence suggesting the role the lateral septum could be playing in fear memory formation and consolidation have started emerging at the end of the 20th century. Inhibitory avoidance tasks using footshock chambers on mice were deployed to study the effects of the disruption of the lateral septum and hippocampal inputs on fear memory formation and retrieval respectively. In both cases, fear memory formation/retrieval was impaired, supporting the hypothesis that hippocampal projections to the lateral septum are at least in part responsible for these mechanisms. The lateral septum could also prove essential in fear memory consolidation. Post-shock administration of CRF into the lateral septum enhanced fear memory in the relelvant context; however, this finding still needs to be supported by further studies.
