= Perforant path =

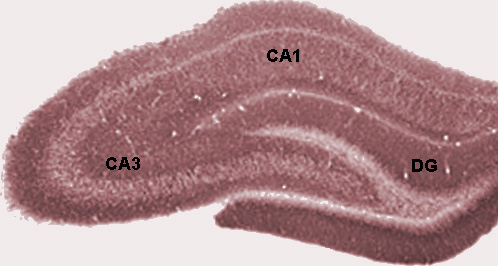
- Diagram of hippocampal regions. DG: Dentate gyrus. Perforant path not labeled, but would arise from the right.

Details

Identifiers
- Latin: tractus perforans
- MeSH: D019580
- NeuroNames: 2686

In the brain, the perforant path or perforant pathway provides a connectional route from the entorhinal cortex to all fields of the hippocampal formation, including the dentate gyrus, all CA fields (including CA1), and the subiculum.

Though it arises mainly from entorhinal layers II and III, the perforant path comprises a smaller component that originates in deep layers V and VI. There is a major dichotomy with respect to the laminar origin and related terminal distribution: neurons in layer II (and possibly layer VI) project to the dentate gyrus and CA3, whereas layer III (and possibly layer V) cells project to CA1 and the subiculum via the temporoammonic pathway.

In addition to playing a role in spatial memory learning generally, the temporoammonic branch (TA-CA1) of the perforant path mediates spatial memory consolidation. The temporoammonic pathway has also been implicated in stress-based animal models of depression.

It may also play a role in temporal lobe seizures.

== In rats ==
In rats, pyramidal and stellate cells in layer II of entorhinal cortex project through the subiculum of the hippocampus, giving rise to the name "perforant pathway". These glutamatergic fibers form a laminar pattern and terminate in the dentate gyrus and cornu ammonis 3 (CA3) region of the hippocampus. Fibers arising in the lateral portions of the entorhinal cortex show enkephalin immunoreactivity, whereas medial portions appear to contain cholecystokinin. Additionally, pyramidal cells in layer III of the entorhinal cortex send topographic projections along the perforant pathway which branch into the subiculum and CA1.

== In mice ==
In mice, the projection to CA1, and the subiculum all come primarily from EC layer III.

According to Suh et al. (2011 Science 334:1415) the projection to CA3 and dentate gyrus in mice is primarily from layer II of entorhinal cortex, and forms a trisynaptic path with hippocampus (dentate gyrus to CA3 to CA1), distinguished from the direct (monosynaptic) perforant path from Layer III of entorhinal cortex to CA1 and subiculum.
