= Basket cell =

Cerebellar neural cell

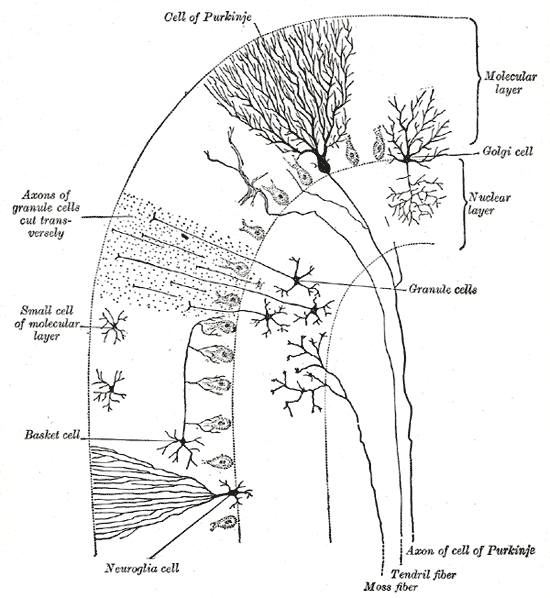
- Transverse section of a cerebellar folium (Basket cell labeled at bottom left)

Details
- Location: Cerebellum
- Shape: multipolar
- Function: Inhibitory interneuron
- Neurotransmitter: GABA
- Presynaptic connections: Parallel fibers
- Postsynaptic connections: Purkinje cells

Identifiers
- NeuroLex ID: nifext_160

Basket cells are inhibitory GABAergic interneurons of the brain, found throughout different regions of the cortex and cerebellum.

== Anatomy and physiology ==
Basket cells are multipolar GABAergic interneurons that function to make inhibitory synapses and control the overall potentials of target cells. In general, dendrites of basket cells are free branching, contain smooth spines, and extend from 3 to 9 mm. Axons are highly branched, ranging in total from 20 to 50mm in total length. The branched axonal arborizations give rise to the name as they appear as baskets surrounding the soma of the target cell. Basket cells form axo-somatic synapses, meaning their synapses target somas of other cells. By controlling the somas of other neurons, basket cells can directly control the action potential discharge rate of target cells.

Basket cells can be found throughout the brain, in among other the cortex, hippocampus, amygdala, basal ganglia, and the cerebellum.

== Cortex ==
In the cortex, basket cells have sparsely branched axons giving off small pericellular, basket-shaped elaborations at several intervals along their length. Basket cells make up 5-10% of total neurons in the cortex. There are three types of basket cells in the cortex, the small, large and nest type: The axon of a small basket cell arborizes in the vicinity of that same cell's dendritic range, this axon is short. In contrast, large basket cells innervate somata in different cortical columns due to a long axon. The nest basket cells are an intermediate form of the small and large cells, their axons are confined mainly to the same cortical layer as their somata. Nest basket cells have "radiating axonal collaterals" between that of large and small basket cells. They are included as basket cells because they are interneurons that perform axo-somatic synapses.

== Hippocampus ==
Hippocampal basket cells target somata and proximal dendrites of pyramidal neurons. Similar to their counterparts in the cortex, hippocampal basket cells are also parvalbumin-expressing and fast-spiking. In the CA3 region of the hippocampus, basket cells can often form recurrent inhibition loops with pyramidal cells. Projections from a pyramidal cell will innervate the basket cell, which in turn has a projection back onto the original pyramidal cells. Since basket cells are inhibitory, this generates a closed loop that can help dampen excitatory responses.

== Cerebellum ==
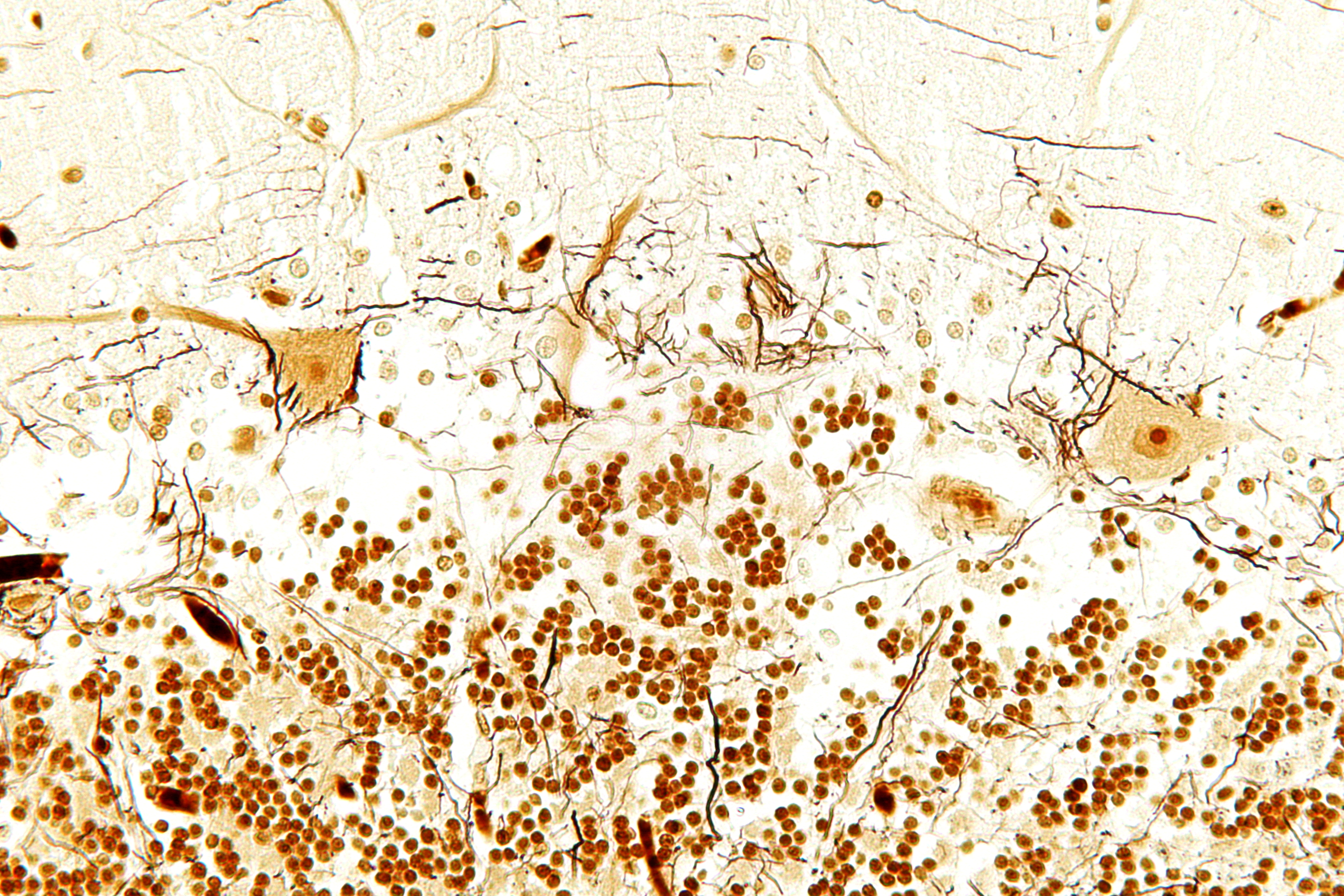
Micrograph of cerebellar cortex showing Purkinje cells within the baskets formed by the processes of basket cells. Bielschowsky stain.

In the cerebellum, the multipolar basket cells have branching dendrites, which are dilated and knotty. Basket cells synapse on the cell bodies of Purkinje cells and make inhibitory synapses with Purkinje cells. Cerebellar basket cell axons fire inhibitory neurotransmitters such as GABA to Purkinje cell axons, and inhibits the Purkinje cell. Purkinje cells send inhibitory messages to the deep cerebellar nuclei and are responsible for the sole output of motor coordination from the cerebellar cortex. With the work of the basket cell, Purkinje cells do not send the inhibitory response for motor coordination and motor movement occurs.

== Additional images ==
Microcircuitry of the cerebellum. Excitatory synapses are denoted by (+) and inhibitory synapses by (-). Basket cell labeled BC.

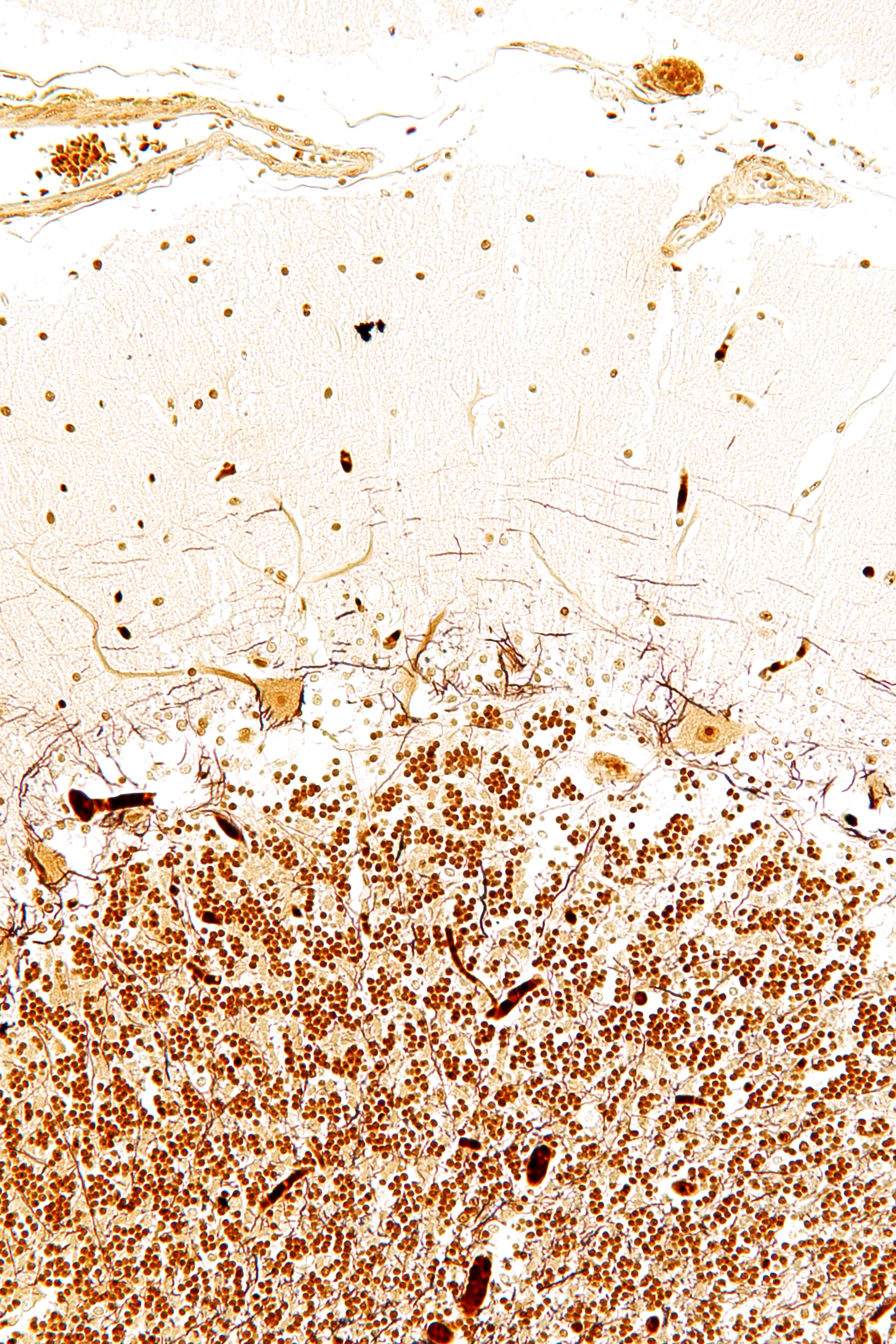
Cerebellum

== See also ==
List of distinct cell types in the adult human body
