= Medial septal nucleus =

One of the septal nuclei in the brain

- Medial septal nucleus of the mouse brain

Details

Identifiers
- Latin: nucleus septalis medialis
- NeuroNames: 262
- NeuroLex ID: birnlex_1668
- TA98: A14.1.09.269; A14.1.09.446
- FMA: 61879

The medial septal nucleus (MS) is one of the septal nuclei. Neurons in this nucleus give rise to the bulk of efferents from the septal nuclei. A major projection from the medial septal nucleus terminates in the hippocampal formation.

It plays a role in the generation of theta waves in the hippocampus. Specifically, the GABAergic cells of the medial septum that act as theta pacemakers target dentate gyrus, CA3, and CA1 interneurons. Pacemaking MS interneurons express hyperpolarization-activated cyclic nucleotide-gated (HCN) channels which likely, at least partially, mediate their pacemaker properties.

It is composed of GABAergic cells, glutamatergic cells, and cholinergic cells. Each cell-type carries out different functions. In addition to the theta wave generation, it has recently been discovered that medial septum also serves as an important node for sensory valence processing. For example, Vglut2 neurons in medial septum respond strongly to noxious sensory stimulation.
