= Trisynaptic circuit =

Neural circuit in the hippocampus

The trisynaptic circuit or trisynaptic loop is a relay of synaptic transmission in the hippocampus. The trisynaptic circuit is a neural circuit in the hippocampus, which is made up of three major cell groups: granule cells in the dentate gyrus, pyramidal neurons in CA3, and pyramidal neurons in CA1. The hippocampal relay involves three main regions within the hippocampus which are classified according to their cell type and projection fibers. The first projection of the hippocampus occurs between the entorhinal cortex (EC) and the dentate gyrus (DG). The entorhinal cortex transmits its signals from the parahippocampal gyrus to the dentate gyrus via granule cell fibers known collectively as the perforant path. The dentate gyrus then synapses on pyramidal cells in CA3 via mossy cell fibers. CA3 then fires to CA1 via Schaffer collaterals which synapse in the subiculum and are carried out through the fornix of the brain. Collectively the dentate gyrus, CA1, and CA3 of the hippocampus compose the trisynaptic loop.

EC → DG via the perforant path (synapse 1), DG → CA3 via mossy fibres (synapse 2), CA3 → CA1 via schaffer collaterals (synapse 3)

== History ==
The circuit was initially described by the neuroanatomist Santiago Ramon y Cajal, in the early twentieth century, using the Golgi staining method. After the discovery of the trisynaptic circuit, a series of research has been conducted to determine the mechanisms driving this circuit. Today, research is focused on how this loop interacts with other parts of the brain, and how it influences human physiology and behaviour. For example, it has been shown that disruptions within the trisynaptic circuit lead to behavioural changes in rodent and feline models.

== Structures ==
=== Entorhinal cortex ===
The entorhinal cortex (EC) is a structure in the brain located in the medial temporal lobe. The EC is composed of six distinct layers. The superficial (outer) layers, which include layers I through III, are mainly input layers that receive signals from other parts of the EC, but also project to hippocampal structures via the perforant path. Layer II of the entorhinal cortex projects mainly to the dentate gyrus and CA3, while layer III is thought to project mainly to the CA1 of the hippocampus. The deep (inner) layers, layers IV to VI, are the main output layers, and send signals to different parts of the EC and other cortical areas.

=== Dentate gyrus ===
The dentate gyrus (DG) is the innermost section of the hippocampal formation. The dentate gyrus consists of three layers: molecular, granular, and polymorphic. Granule neurons, which are the most prominent type of DG cells, are mainly found in the granular layer. These granule cells are the major source of input of the hippocampal formation, receiving most of their information from layer II of the entorhinal cortex, via the perforant pathway. Information from the DG is directed to the pyramidal cells of CA3 through mossy fibres. Neurons within the DG are famous for being one of two nervous system areas capable of neurogenesis, the growth or development of nervous tissue.

=== Cornu ammonis 3 ===
The CA3 is a portion of the hippocampal formation adjacent to the dentate gyrus. Input is received from the granule cells of the dentate gyrus through the mossy fibres. The CA3 is rich in pyramidal neurons (like those found throughout the neocortex), which project mainly to the CA1 pyramidal neurons via the Schaffer collateral pathway. The CA3 pyramidal neurons have been analogized as the "pacemaker" of the trisynaptic loop in the generation of the hippocampal theta rhythm. One study has found that the CA3 plays an essential role in the consolidation of memories when examining CA3 regions using the Morris water maze.

=== Cornu ammonis 1 ===
The CA1 is the region within the hippocampus between the subiculum, the innermost area of the hippocampal formation, and region CA2. The CA1 is separated from the dentate gyrus by the hippocampal sulcus. Cells within the CA1 are mostly pyramidal cells, similar to those in CA3. The CA1 completes the circuit by feeding back to the deep layers, mainly layer V, of the entorhinal cortex.

== Associated brain areas ==
There are many brain structures that transmit information to, and from the trisynaptic circuit. The activity of these different structures can be directly or indirectly modulated by the activity of the trisynaptic loop.

=== Fornix ===
The fornix is a C-shaped bundle of axons that begins in the hippocampal formation of both hemispheres, referred to as the fimbria, and extend through the crus of fornix, also known as the posterior pillars. The fimbria section of the fornix is directly connected to the alveus, which is a portion of the hippocampal formation that arises from the subiculum and the hippocampus (specifically the CA1). Both crura of the fornix form intimate connections with the underside of the corpus callosum and support the hippocampal commissure, a large bundle of axon that connects the left and right hippocampal formations. The fornix plays a key role in hippocampal outputs, specifically in connecting CA3 to a variety of subcortical structures, and connecting CA1 and the subiculum to a variety of parahippocampal regions, via the fimbria. The fornix is also essential for hippocampal information input and neuromodulatory input, specifically from the medial septum, diencephalic brain structures, and the brain stem.

=== Cingulate gyrus ===
The cingulate gyrus plays a key role in the limbic system's emotion formation and processing. The cingulate cortex is separated into an anterior and a posterior region, which corresponds to areas 24, 32, 33 (anterior) and 23 (posterior) of the Brodmann areas. The anterior region receives information mainly from the mamillary bodies while the posterior cingulate receives information from the subiculum via the Papez circuit.

=== Mammillary bodies ===
The mammillary bodies are two clusters of cell bodies found at the ends of the posterior fibres of the fornix within the diencephalon. The mammillary bodies relay information from the hippocampal formation (via the fornix) to the thalamus (via the mammillothalamic tract). The mammillary bodies are integral parts of the limbic system and have been shown to be important in recollective memory.

=== Thalamus ===
The thalamus is a bundle of nuclei located between the cerebral cortex and the midbrain. Many of the thalamic nuclei receive inputs from the hippocampal formation. The mammillothalamic tract relays information received from the mamillary bodies (via the fornix) and transmits it to the anterior nuclei of the thalamus. Research has shown that the thalamus plays a key role with respect to spatial and episodic memories.

=== Association cortex ===
The association cortex includes most of the cerebral surface of the brain and is responsible for processing that goes between the arrival of input in the primary sensory cortex and the generation of behaviour. Receives and integrates information from various parts of the brain and influences many cortical and subcortical targets. Inputs to the association cortices include the primary and secondary sensory and motor cortices, the thalamus, and the brain stem. The association cortex projects to places including the hippocampus, basal ganglia, and cerebellum, and other association cortices. Examination of patients with damages to one or more of these regions, as well as noninvasive brain imaging, it has been found that the association cortex is especially important for attending to complex stimuli in the external and internal environments. The temporal association cortex identifies the nature of stimuli, while the frontal association cortex plans behavioural responses to the stimuli.

=== Amygdala ===
The amygdala is an almond-shaped group of nuclei found deep and medially within the temporal lobes of the brain. Known to be the area of the brain responsible for emotional reaction, but plays an important role in processing of memory and decision making as well. It is part of the limbic system. The amygdala projects to various structures in the brain including the hypothalamus, the thalamic reticular nucleus, and more.

=== Medial septum ===
The medial septum plays a role in the generation of theta waves in the brain. In an experiment, it has been proposed that the generation of theta oscillations involves an ascending pathway leading from the brainstem to hypothalamus to medial septum to hippocampus. The same experiment demonstrated that injection of lidocaine, a local anesthetic, inhibits theta oscillations from the medial septum projecting to the hippocampus.

== Relationship with other physiological systems ==
=== Role in rhythm generation ===
It has been proposed that the trisynaptic circuit is responsible for the generation of hippocampal theta waves. These waves are responsible for the synchronization of different brain regions, especially the limbic system. In rats, theta waves range between 3–8 Hz and their amplitudes range from 50 to 100 μV. Theta waves are especially prominent during ongoing behaviors and during rapid eye movement (REM) sleep.

=== Respiratory system ===
Studies have shown that the respiratory system interacts with the brain in generating theta oscillations in the hippocampus. There are numerous studies on the different effects of oxygen concentration on hippocampal theta oscillations, leading to implications of anesthetic use during surgeries, and influence on sleep patterns. Some of these oxygen environments include hyperoxic conditions, which is a condition where there is excess oxygen (greater than 21%). There are adverse effects involved with rat placement in hyperoxia condition. Hypercapnia is a condition where there is high oxygen concentrations with a mixture of carbon dioxide (95% and 5%, respectively). In normoxic conditions, which is basically the air we breath (with oxygen concentrations at 21%). The air we breath is composed of the following five gases: nitrogen (78%), oxygen (21%), water vapor (5%), argon (1%), and carbon dioxide (0.03%). Finally, in hypoxic conditions, which is a condition of low oxygen concentration (less than 21% oxygen concentrations).

There are physiological and psychological disorders related to prolonged exposure to hypoxic conditions. For example, sleep apnea is a condition where there is partial, or complete, blockage of breathing during sleep. In addition, the respiratory system linked to central nervous system via base of brain. Thus, prolonged exposure to low oxygen concentration has detrimental effects on the brain.

=== Sensorimotor system ===
Experimental research has shown that there are two prominent types of theta oscillation which are each associated with different related to a motor response. Type I theta waves correspond with exploratory behaviours including walking, running, and rearing. Type II theta waves are associated with immobility during the initiation or the intention of initiation of a motor response.

=== Limbic system ===
Theta oscillations generated by the trisynaptic loop have been shown to be synchronized with brain activity in the anterior ventral thalamus. Hippocampal theta has also been linked to the activation of the anterior medial and the anterior dorsal areas of the thalamus. The synchronization between these limbic structures and the trisynaptic loop is essential for proper emotional processing.

See also: EC-hippocampus system
