= Hippocampal subfields =

Part of the brain of mammals

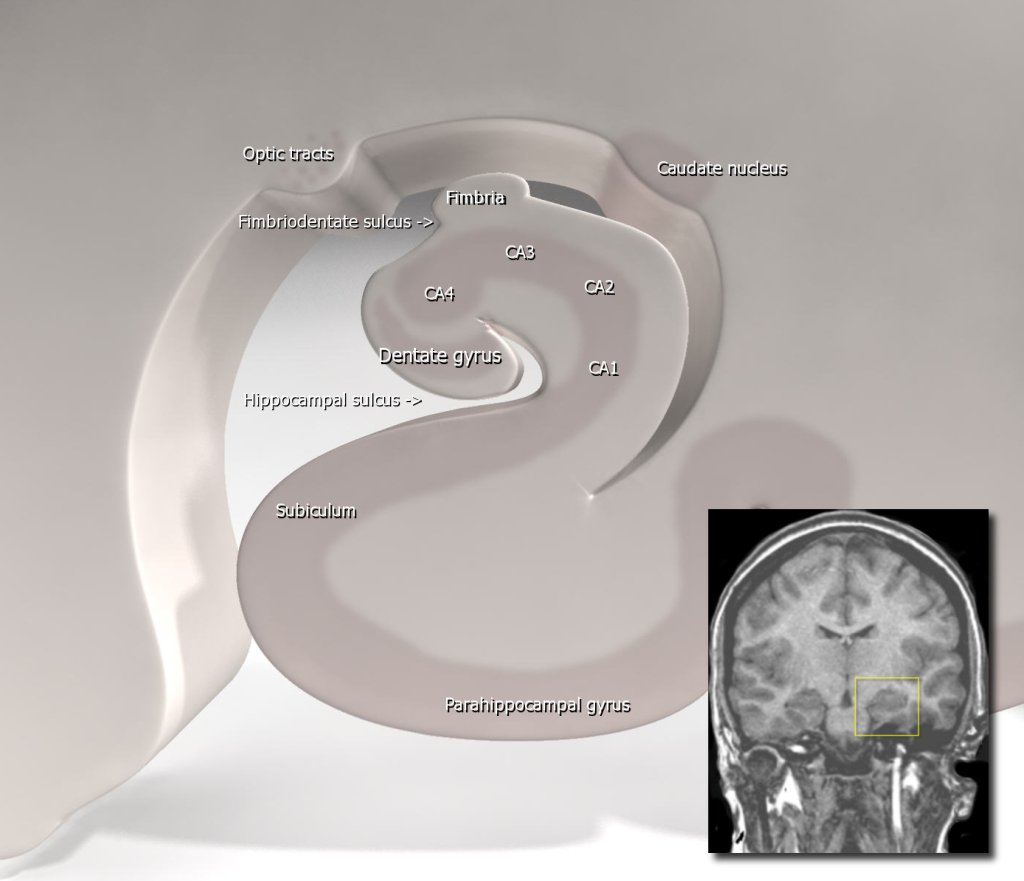
- Subfields of the hippocampus shown in the hippocampal formation in a human, coronal plane

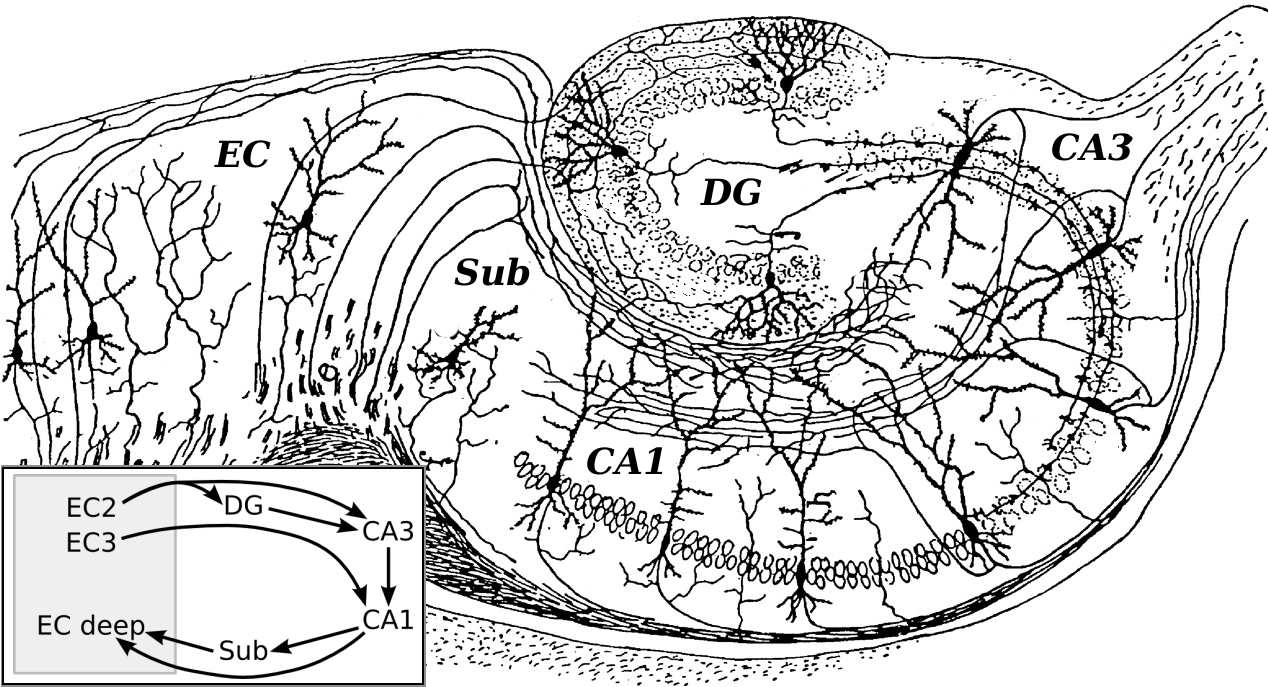
- Basic circuit of the hippocampus, shown using a modified drawing by Ramon y Cajal. DG: dentate gyrus. Sub: subiculum. EC: entorhinal cortex

Identifiers
- NeuroNames: 182
- TA98: A14.1.09.327
- TA2: 5520
- FMA: 62493

The hippocampal subfields are four subfields CA1, CA2, CA3, and CA4 that make up the structure of the hippocampus. Regions described in the hippocampus are the head, body, and tail, and other hippocampal subfields include the dentate gyrus, the presubiculum, and the subiculum. The CA subfields use the initials of cornu ammonis, an earlier name of the hippocampus.

== Structure ==
There are four hippocampal subfields, in the hippocampus proper which form a neural circuit called the trisynaptic circuit.

=== CA1 ===
CA1 is the first region in the hippocampal circuit, from which a significant output pathway goes to layer V of the entorhinal cortex. The main output of CA1 is to the subiculum.

=== CA2 ===
CA2 is a small region located between CA1 and CA3. It receives some input from layer II of the entorhinal cortex via the perforant path. Its pyramidal cells are more like those in CA3 than those in CA1.

=== CA3 ===
CA3 receives input from the mossy fibers of the granule cells in the dentate gyrus, and also from cells in the entorhinal cortex via the perforant path. The mossy fiber pathway ends in the stratum lucidum. The perforant path passes through the stratum lacunosum and ends in the stratum moleculare. There are also inputs from the medial septum and from the diagonal band of Broca which terminate in the stratum radiatum, along with commisural connections from the other side of the hippocampus.

The pyramidal cells in CA3 have a unique type of dendritic spine called a thorny excrescence or thorn, only found in CA3 pyramidal cells and hilar mossy cells. The thorn has a thin single spine with a number of heads. Clusters of thorns sit on a dendrite on a broad stem. There are also longer spines called long-neck spines. These unique structures also help to demarcate CA3 from CA2.

The pyramidal cells in CA3 send some axons back to the dentate gyrus hilus, but they mostly project to regions CA2 and CA1 via the Schaffer collaterals. There are also a significant number of recurrent connections that terminate in CA3. Both the recurrent connections and the Schaffer collaterals terminate preferentially in the septal area in a dorsal direction from the originating cells. CA3 also sends a small set of output fibers to the lateral septum.

The region is conventionally divided into three divisions. CA3a is the part of the cell band that is most distant from the dentate (and closest to CA1). CA3b is the middle part of the band nearest to the fimbria and fornix connection. CA3c is nearest to the dentate, inserting into the hilus. CA3 overall, has been considered to be the "pacemaker" of the hippocampus. Much of the synchronous bursting activity associated with interictal epileptiform activity appears to be generated in CA3. Its excitatory collateral connectivity seems to be mostly responsible for this. CA3 uniquely, has pyramidal cell axon collaterals that ramify extensively with local regions and make excitatory contacts with them. CA3 has been implicated in a number of working theories on memory and hippocampal learning processes. Slow oscillatory rhythms (theta-band; 3–8 Hz) are cholinergically driven patterns that depend on coupling of interneurons and pyramidal cell axons via gap junctions, as well as glutaminergic (excitatory) and GABAergic (inhibitory) synapses. Sharp EEG waves seen here are also implicated in memory consolidation.

A key physiological function of the CA3 is encoding heteroassociative memories using its recurrent circuitry. A seminal hypothesis by John Lisman postulated that during a single theta cycle, a defined set of CA3 principal neurons can activate each other to form a well defined sequence, and the spikes (action potentials) of these cells tend to coincide with the peaks of the superimposed gamma oscillation. Approximately a decade later, the existence of well-defined CA3 sequences has experimentally been shown in the laboratory of Loren Frank, moreover these results demonstrated that previously encoded sequential experience can be replayed by the CA3 region during episodes called "awake replay". A recent hypothesis postulates that CA3 sequences are built up pair by pair during memory encoding, relying on precisely timed, phase-precessing input from the entorhinal cortex. This mechanism is based on the synapses of the CA3 recurrent axon corraterals on the dendrites of the CA3 population that form a complete matrix of connections.

=== CA4 ===
CA4 is a misleading term introduced by Lorente de Nó. He observed that the pyramidal layer of the CA3 was continuous with polymorphic layer of the dentate gyrus and that the "modified pyramids" (later known as mossy cells) had Schaffer collaterals similar to CA3 pyramidal cells. Amaral showed that the mossy cells in the CA4 of Lorente de Nó did not have schaffer collaterals and that, in contrast to pyramidal cells, they project to the inner molecular layer of the DG and not to CA1. The same author thus concluded that the term CA4 should be abandoned and that the zone should be regarded as the polymorphic layer of the dentate gyrus (the area dentata of Blackstad (1956)). The polymorphic layer is often called the hilus or hilar region. The neurons in the polymorphic layer, including mossy cells and GABAergic interneurons, primarily receive inputs from the granule cells in the dentate gyrus in the form of mossy fibers and project to the inner molecular layer of the dentate gyrus via the associational/commissural projection. They also receive a small number of connections from pyramidal cells in CA3. They, in turn, project back into the dentate gyrus at distant septotemporal levels.

== Additional images ==
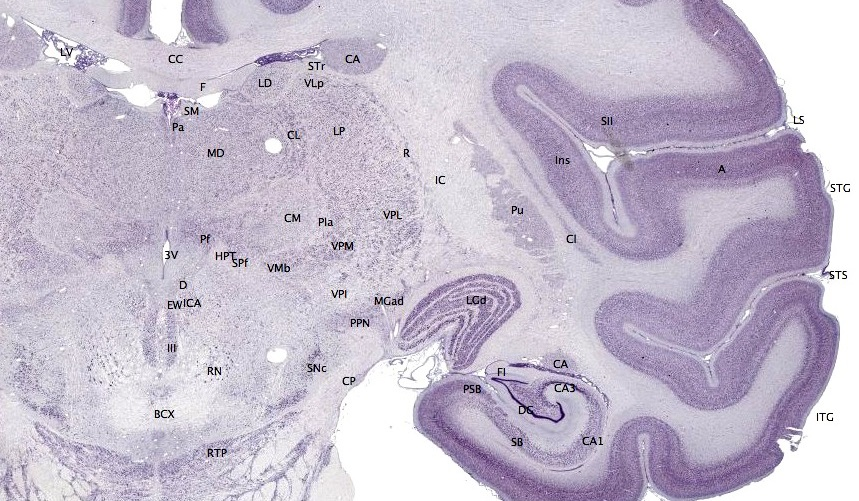
Macaque (Macaca Mulatta) brain, coronal section through the hippocampus.

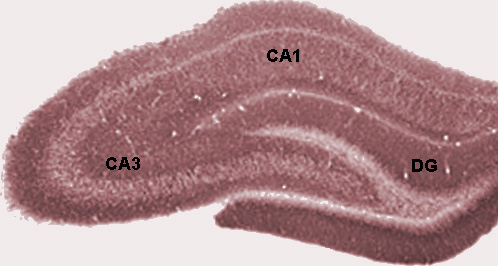
Diagram of hippocampal regions in a rat brain.
