= Deficiency of RbAp48 protein and memory loss =

Memory is commonly referred to as the ability to encode, store, retain and subsequently recall information and past experiences in the human brain. This process involves many proteins, one of which is the Histone-binding protein RbAp48 (also known as RBBP4 or NURF55), encoded by the RBBP4 gene in humans.

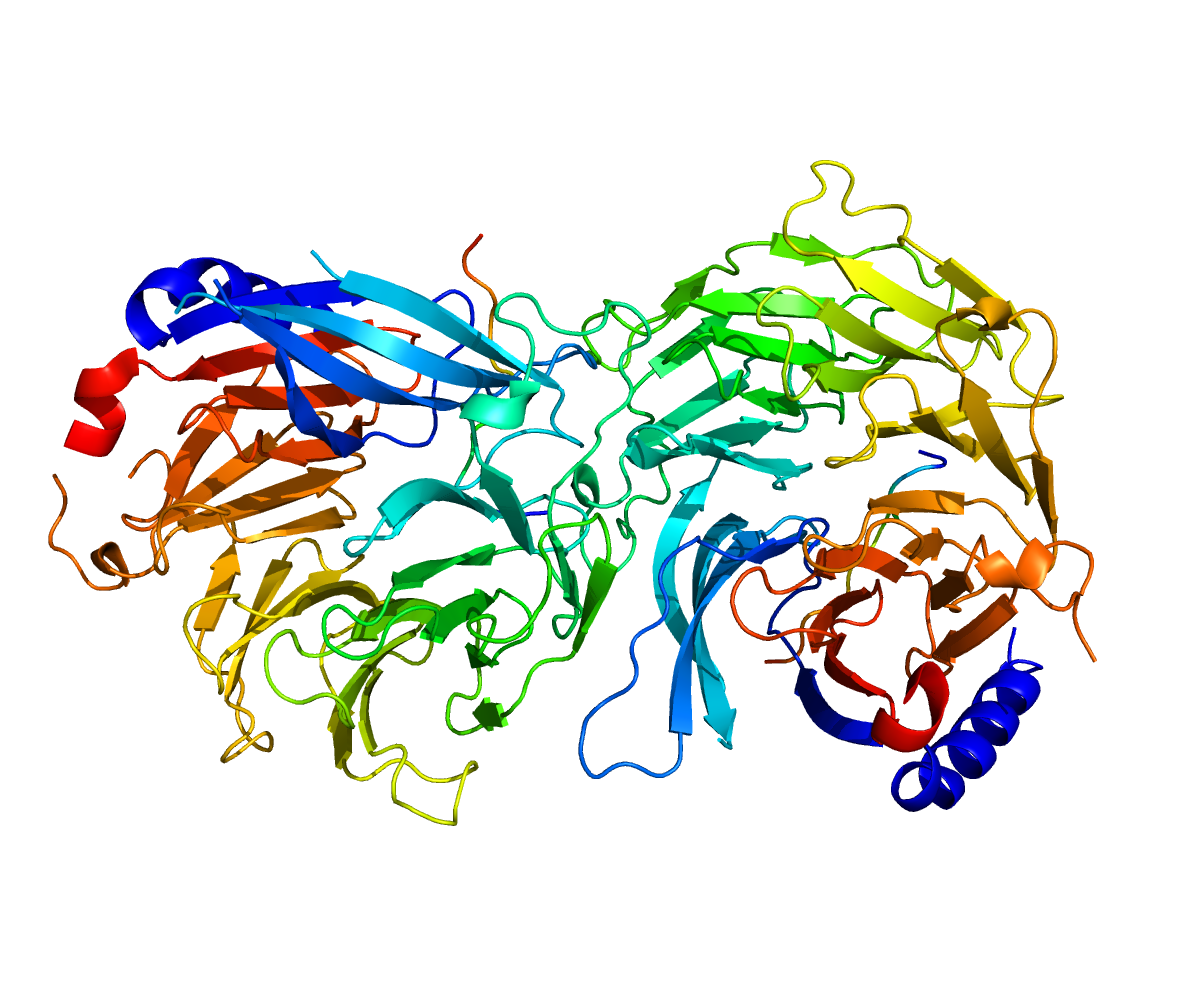
Structure of protein RBBP4

== Function ==
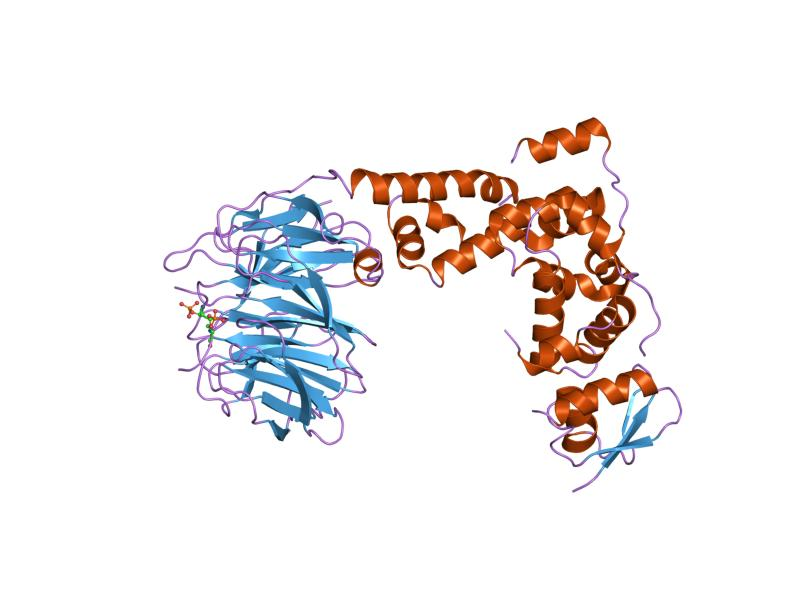
Cartoon representation of the molecular structure of protein with 1p22, belongs to WD40 repeat

RbAp48, also known as RBBP4 gene, encodes a nuclear protein, which belongs to a highly conserved family of WD40 repeat. This gene is present in many protein complexes that are involved in histone acetylation and deacetylation processes as well as chromatin assembly. This gene also belongs to the Mi-2/NuRD complex, also known as nucleosome remodeling deacetylase complex which plays a role in both ATP-dependent chromatin remodeling and histone deacetylase activities. This protein is also part of a co-repressor complex which is an important component of transcriptional silencing. This gene is widely available and can be found in several cellular proteins which bind directly to the retinoblastoma protein to regulate growth and cell proliferation. This protein also found in the transcriptional repression of E2F-responsive genes, which are a group of genes that encode for a family of transcription factors.

== Biochemistry ==
=== Experimental process ===
To further distinguish age-related memory loss from Alzheimer's disease (AD), a subregion of the hippocampal formation called the dentate gyrus (DG) was further studied, since it is thought to be targeted by aging. Human postmortem tissue was collected from both DG and entorhinal cortex (EC). Entorhinal cortex is a neighboring subregion unaffected by aging and known to be implicated in age-related memory loss. After normalizing the expression of EC, 17 genes were manifested due to age-related changes in the DG. Mice were used as the experimental subjects to test whether the decline of RbAp48 was also related to age-related memory loss. The results were consistent with the human studies, where the level of RbAp48 protein was much lower in adults as compared to the young. To solidify these findings, magnetic resonance imaging (MRI) was performed which revealed that dysfunction occurred in the DG, corresponding to the regionally selective decreases in histone acetylation.

=== Mechanism ===
The hippocampus is a brain region which has many interconnected subregions, with each region having its own distinct neuron populations playing an important role in encoding memory. Many studies showed that Alzheimer's disease (AD) ameliorates memory by first acting on the entorhinal cortex (EC) which is the region providing the main input conduit from the external sensors to the hippocampus. Scientists initially identified memory loss associated with aging as an early manifestation of Alzheimer's; however, more recent evidence suggests that a distinct process affects the dentate gyrus (DG), which is a subregion of the hippocampus, and causes memory deterioration. The hippocampal formation is made up of many interconnected subregions and plays a vital role in retaining memory. Each subregion contains a specific population of neurons which have distinct molecular expression and physiological properties. As a result, these regions are vulnerable to various pathogenic mechanisms. Although both AD and the normal aging process affect the hippocampus, studies showed that these two processes can be distinguished by two anatomical patterns of hippocampal dysfunctions. Postmortem studies suggest that the entorhinal cortex (EC) and the subiculum are the hippocampal subregions most affected by AD, whereas the dentate gyrus is relatively preserved in most cases. In contrast to AD, the normal aging process does not cause cell death or other pathognomonic abnormalities that result in memory loss. Rather, age-related memory loss is characterized by dysfunctioning neurons. These results from MRI and other studies suggest that the primary initial target of normal aging is the DG, whereas the EC is relatively preserved.

==== Clinical study on humans ====
Guided by the pattern that distinguishes age-related hippocampal dysfunction from AD, scientists from Columbia University Medical Center collected the dentate gyrus (DG) from postmortem human brains. These DG were free from any detectable brain pathology. These experimental subjects from which the DG was taken ranged from 33 to 88 years of age. Scientist also harvested the EC from each brain and generated gene expression profiles with Affymetrix microarray chips, where each microarray was customized to each individual's brain area. Their hypothesis was driven by the analysis that the DG is preferentially affected by aging rather than AD. The gene expression in the DG was normalized to their expression in EC; the normalized values of DG were then analyzed to find the correlation between age of the experimental subjects. Scientists found that 17 normalized profiles showed an increase and decrease with correlation to age. With a P ≤ 0.005, scientists confirmed that the observed changes were not the product of age-related change but rather the product of their relative abundance in the EC. One of the biggest change in terms of gene expression was the expression of gene RbAp48, where the p value conformed to the pattern of normal age-associated hippocampal dysfunction. To further advance their studies, scientists collected EC and DG from an additional 10 healthy human brains with ages ranging from 49 to 81 years. After the level of RbAp48 and actin in every single tissue was measured using Western blot, they discovered that the level of RbAp48 decreased with the increasing age. The level of mRNA also decreased as the age of the subject increased in DG; however, the level of RbAp48 remained unchanged in the EC.

==== Clinical study on animals ====
In mice, the RbAp48 protein is key component in histone acetylation, transcriptional regulation and in cyclic adenosine monophosphate (cAMP)-protein kinase element-binding protein CREB1 path way. Since histone acetylation and the cAMP-PKA-CREB1 pathway are extremely important for normal hippocampal function and aging in mice, scientists further investigate RbAp48 to test whether its modulation was the cause of age-related memory losses in animals, especially mice. By studying wild-type mice, Scientists discovered that RbAp48 was expressed at a much higher level in the hippocampus, particularly in the dentate gyrus (DG). This finding was consistent with what they found in mice tissue because RbAp48 protein was less abundant in the DG of adult mice, as compared to a lower expression level in adult. In addition, the age-related reduction of RbAp48 was only detected in the DG, whereas the region of EC was preserved. This finding further solidifies the previous discovery that aging only affects the DG and does not cause the dysfunction of EC.

=== DNA interaction ===
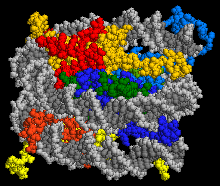
The crystal structure of the nucleosome core particle where H3 and H4 are coloured in blue and green respectively.DNA is coloured gray

In eukaryotic cells, DNA is wrapped around an octamer of histone proteins to form nucleosomes, which fold into higher-order chromatin structures. The nucleosome comprises two copies of histone H3 and histone H4. These nucleosomes form a heterotetramer and bind to DNA in the first step of nucleosome assembly. When DNA is replicated, nucleosomes need to be disassembled in front of the fork and the histones must then be transferred to the newly duplicated strands for reassembly. Studies of the in- vivo composition of histone H3 complexes, as well as the structural of the ASF1-H3-H4 complex, have shown that histone H3-H4 complexes are handled as a protein dimer.

Proteins RbAp48 is a key player in the assembly of nucleosomes. RbAp48 protein is a subunit of the chromatin-assembly factor-1 (CAF-1) complex, which assembles histones H3 and H4 onto newly replicated DNA to initiate nucleosomes assembly. RbAp48 protein is also found in numerous other protein complexes for regulation of chromatin structure. Studies show that RbAp48 interacts with H3-H4 dimers and imply that the function of RbAp48 is involved in numerous process such as chromatin assembly, remodeling and modifications; therefore, in many other chromatin-related processes, histones H3-H4 might be handled as a dimer. More generally, it seems plausible that the presence of RbAp48 may reflex the post-translational modifications of the nucleosome. As a result, this can affect the activities of neurons and ultimately impact the memory encoding ability

== Cellular function ==
- Histone acetylation and transcriptional regulation

It has been known for some time that histone acetylation is intimately connected with transcriptional regulation.

- Chromatin function and acetylation

A direct link between chromatin function and acetylation was established by the discovery that co-activator complexes were required for transcriptional activation function as histone acetyltransferases, whereas co-repressors containing histone deacetylases confer transcriptional repression. Histones are locally modified on target promoters.

== CREB complex ==
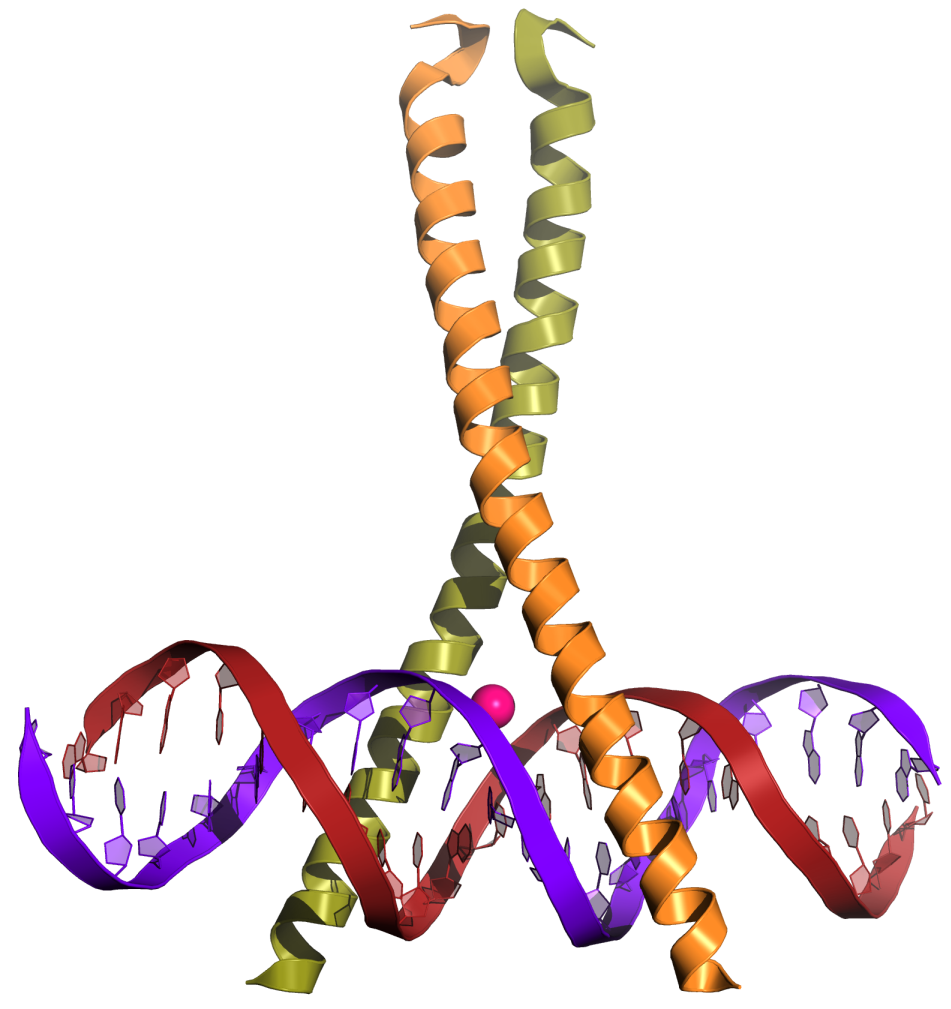
CREB (top) is a transcription factor capable of binding to DNA (bottom) and regulating gene expression

CREB-binding protein, also known as CREBBP or CBP, is a protein that is encoded by the CREBBP gene in humans. The CREB protein carries out its function by activating transcription, where interaction with transcription factors is managed by one or more CREB domains: the nuclear receptor interaction domain (RID), the CREB and MYB interaction domain (KIX), the cysteine/histidine regions (TAZ1/CH1 and TAZ2/CH3) and the interferon response binding domain (IBiD). The CREB protein domains, KIX, TAZ1 and TAZ2, each bind tightly to a sequence spanning both transactivation domains 9aaTADs of transcription factor p53.

== Protein interaction ==
- SIN3
- BRCA1
- CREBBP
