= Macaque brain development timeline =

Brain development timeline

Species
Macaca mulatta
Family
Cercopithecidae
Order
Primates
Gestation
165 days

Dates in days

Day	Event	Reference
30	retinal ganglion cell generation - start of neurogenesis	Robinson and Dreher (1990)
30	magnocellular basal forebrain - peak of neurogenesis	Finlay and Darlington (1995)
30	superficial superior collicus (SC) laminae - start of neurogenesis	Robinson and Dreher (1990)
30	raphe complex - peak of neurogenesis	Finlay and Darlington (1995)
32	locus coeruleus - peak of neurogenesis	Finlay and Darlington (1995)
35	posterior commissure appears	Ashwell et al. (1996)
35.5	medial forebrain bundle appears	Ashwell et al. (1996)
36	dorsal lateral geniculate nucleus (dLGN)- start of neurogenesis	Robinson and Dreher (1990)
36	optic axons at chiasm of optic tract	Dunlop et al. (1997)
38	deep cerebellar nuclei - peak of neurogenesis	Finlay and Darlington (1995)
38	amygdala - peak of neurogenesis	Finlay and Darlington (1995)
39	Purkinje cells - peak of neurogenesis	Finlay and Darlington (1995)
39	substantia nigra - peak of neurogenesis	Finlay and Darlington (1995)
39.5	subplate - start of neurogenesis	Robinson and Dreher (1990)
39.5	subplate -start of neurogenesis	Robinson and Dreher (1990)
40	internal capsule appears	Ashwell et al. (1996)
40	external capsule appears	Ashwell et al. (1996)
40	fasciculus retroflexus appears	Ashwell et al. (1996)
40	retinal horizontal cells - peak of neurogenesis	Finlay and Darlington (1995)
41	superior colliculus - peak of neurogenesis	Finlay and Darlington (1995)
43	subplate - peak of neurogenesis	Finlay and Darlington (1995)
43	dLGN -peak of neurogenesis	Finlay and Darlington (1995)
43	dLGN- end of neurogenesis	Robinson and Dreher (1990)
43	retinal ganglion cells - peak of neurogenesis	Finlay and Darlington (1995)
43	inferior colliculus - peak of neurogenesis	Finlay and Darlington (1995)
45	neurogenesis cortical layer VI - start (VC) of neurogenesis	Robinson and Dreher (1990)
45	septal nuclei - peak of neurogenesis	Finlay and Darlington (1995)
45	caudoputamen – peak of neurogenesis	Finlay and Darlington (1995)
45	nucleus accumbens - peak of neurogenesis	Finlay and Darlington (1995)
48	stria medullaris thalami appears	Ashwell et al. (1996)
48	subplate - end of neurogenesis	Robinson and Dreher (1990)
48	entorhinal cortex - peak of neurogenesis	Finlay and Darlington (1995)
48	subiculum – peak of neurogenesis	Finlay and Darlington (1995)
48	parasubiculum – peak of neurogenesis	Finlay and Darlington (1995)
48	fornix appears	Ashwell et al. (1996)
48	presubiculum – peak of neurogenesis	Finlay and Darlington (1995)
48	dentate gyrus of hippocampus - peak of neurogenesis	Finlay and Darlington (1995)
48	anterior commissure appears	Ashwell et al. (1996)
48	CA 1, CA 2 of hippocampus - peak of neurogenesis	Finlay and Darlington (1995)
53	neurogenesis cortical layer VI - peak (VC) of neurogenesis	Finlay and Darlington (1995)
56	superficial SC laminae - end of neurogenesis	Robinson and Dreher (1990)
56	cones - peak of neurogenesis	Finlay and Darlington (1995)
56	retinal amacrine cells - peak of neurogenesis	Finlay and Darlington (1995)
57	retinal ganglion cell generation - end of neurogenesis	Robinson and Dreher (1990)
58.5	neurogenesis cortical layer V - start (VC) of neurogenesis	Robinson and Dreher (1990)
65	neurogenesis cortical lamina VI - end (VC) of neurogenesis	Robinson and Dreher (1990)
67	cortical axons reach dLGN	Robinson and Dreher (1990)
69	optic nerve axon number - peak of neurogenesis	Robinson and Dreher (1990)
70	neurogenesis cortical layer V - peak (VC) of neurogenesis	Finlay and Darlington (1995)
70	neurogenesis cortical lamina IV - start (VC) of neurogenesis	Robinson and Dreher (1990)
75	neurogenesis cortical layer V - end (VC) of neurogenesis	Robinson and Dreher (1990)
78	LGN axons in subplate	Robinson and Dreher (1990)
80	neurogenesis cortical layer IV - peak (VC) of neurogenesis	Finlay and Darlington (1995)
81.5	cortical axons innervate dLGN	Robinson and Dreher (1990)
85	neurogenesis cortical layer IV - end (VC) of neurogenesis	Robinson and Dreher (1990)
85	rods - peak of neurogenesis	Finlay and Darlington (1995)
85	retinal bipolar cells - peak of neurogenesis	Finlay and Darlington (1995)
85.5	neurogenesis cortical layer II/III - start (VC) of neurogenesis	Rakic (1974)
86	superficial SC - start of lamination	Robinson and Dreher (1990)
87	ipsi/contra segregation in LGN and SC	Robinson and Dreher (1990)
90	neurogenesis cortical layer II /III - peak (VC) of neurogenesis	Finlay and Darlington (1995)
91	LGN axons in cortical layer IV	Robinson and Dreher (1990)
96	adult-like cortical innervation of dLGN	Robinson and Dreher (1990)
96	visual cortical axons in SC	Robinson and Dreher (1990)
100	neurogenesis cortical layer II/III - end (VC) of neurogenesis	Rakic (1974)
110	rapid axon loss in optic nerve ends	Robinson and Dreher (1990)
123	eye opening	Ashwell et al. (1996); Dunlop et al. (1997); Robinson and Dreher (1990)

== See also ==
- Brain development timelines
- Neural development
- http://www.translatingtime.net Translating Time: A website providing translation of brain developmental times among different species
