= Mouse brain development timeline =

Developmental stage in mice

The house mouse (Mus musculus) has a gestation period of 19 to 21 days. Key events in mouse brain development occur both before and after birth, beginning with peak neurogenesis of the cranial motor nuclei 9 days after conception, up to eye opening which occurs after birth and about 30 days after conception.

== Stages in brain development ==
Days post conception	Event	Reference
9	cranial motor nuclei - peak of neurogenesis	Finlay and Darlington (1995)
10	subplate -start of neurogenesis	Bayer and Altman (1991)
10	inferior olivary nucleus - peak of neurogenesis	Finlay and Darlington (1995)
10.5	retinal ganglion cell generation - start of neurogenesis	Robinson and Dreher (1990)
10.5	superficial superior colliculus (SC) laminae- start of neurogenesis	Robinson and Dreher (1990)
10.5	dorsal lateral geniculate nucleus (dLGN) - start of neurogenesis	Robinson and Dreher (1990)
10.5	Purkinje cells - peak of neurogenesis	Finlay and Darlington (1995)
11	cranial sensory nuclei - peak of neurogenesis	Finlay and Darlington (1995)
11	subplate - peak of neurogenesis	Finlay and Darlington (1995)
11	reticular nuclei - peak of neurogenesis	Finlay and Darlington (1995)
11	medial geniculate nucleus - peak of neurogenesis	Finlay and Darlington (1995)
11	globus pallidus - peak of neurogenesis	Finlay and Darlington (1995)
11.5	ventral LGN - peak of neurogenesis	Finlay and Darlington (1995)
12	dLGN - peak of neurogenesis	Finlay and Darlington (1995)
12	cochlear nuclei - peak of neurogenesis	Finlay and Darlington (1995)
12	mitral cells - peak of neurogenesis	Finlay and Darlington (1995)
12	amygdala - peak of neurogenesis	Finlay and Darlington (1995)
12	subplate - end of neurogenesis	Bayer and Altman (1991)
12.3	axons in optic stalk	Dunlop et al. (1997)
12.5	ventral posterior nucleus (VP) and ventrobasal nucleus (VB) of the thalamus - peak of neurogenesis	Finlay and Darlington (1995)
12.5	nucleus of lateral olfactory tract - peak of neurogenesis	Finlay and Darlington (1995)
12.5	claustrum - peak of neurogenesis	Finlay and Darlington (1995)
12.5	neurogenesis cortical layer VI - peak (VC) of neurogenesis	Finlay and Darlington (1995)
12.5	dLGN- end of neurogenesis	Robinson and Dreher (1990)
12.5	preoptic nucleus - peak of neurogenesis	Finlay and Darlington (1995)
13	medial forebrain bundle appears	Ashwell et al. (1996)
13	suprachiasmatic nucleus - peak of neurogenesis	Finlay and Darlington (1995)
13	optic axons at chiasm of optic tract	Dunlop et al. (1997)
13	superior colliculus - peak of neurogenesis	Finlay and Darlington (1995)
13	retinal ganglion cells - peak of neurogenesis	Finlay and Darlington (1995)
13	septal nuclei - peak of neurogenesis	Finlay and Darlington (1995)
13	entorhinal cortex - peak of neurogenesis	Finlay and Darlington (1995)
13	subiculum – peak of neurogenesis	Finlay and Darlington (1995)
13	neurogenesis cortical layer V - peak (VC) of neurogenesis	Finlay and Darlington (1995)
13	neurogenesis cortical lamina VI - end (VC) of neurogenesis	Caviness (1982)
13.5	raphe complex - peak of neurogenesis	Finlay and Darlington (1995)
13.5	anterior olfactory nucleus - peak of neurogenesis	Finlay and Darlington (1995)
13.5	anteroventral (AV), anterodorsal (AD) and anteromedial (AM) thalamic nuclei - peak of neurogenesis	Finlay and Darlington (1995)
13.5	pontine nuclei – peak of neurogenesis	Finlay and Darlington (1995)
13.5	parasubiculum – peak of neurogenesis	Finlay and Darlington (1995)
13.5	stria terminalis appears	Ashwell et al. (1996)
13.5	presubiculum – peak of neurogenesis	Finlay and Darlington (1995)
14	fasciculus retroflexus appears	Finlay and Darlington (1995)
14	caudoputamen – peak of neurogenesis	Finlay and Darlington (1995)
14	superficial SC laminae - end of neurogenesis	Robinson and Dreher (1990)
14	fornix appears	Ashwell et al. (1996)
14	cones - peak of neurogenesis	Finlay and Darlington (1995)
14	neurogenesis cortical layer V - end (VC) of neurogenesis	Caviness (1982)
14.5	optic axons reach dLGN and SC	Robinson and Dreher (1990)
14.5	anterior commissure appears	Ashwell et al. (1996)
15	neurogenesis cortical lamina IV - start (VC) of neurogenesis	Caviness (1982)
15	CA 1, CA 2 of hippocampus - peak of neurogenesis	Finlay and Darlington (1995)
15	retinal amacrine cells - peak of neurogenesis	Finlay and Darlington (1995)
15	hippocampal commissure appears	Ashwell et al. (1996)
15	neurogenesis cortical layer II /III - peak (VC) of neurogenesis	Finlay and Darlington (1995)
15.5	optic axons invade visual centers	Dunlop et al. (1997)
16	nucleus accumbens - peak of neurogenesis	Finlay and Darlington (1995)
16	tufted cells - peak of neurogenesis	Finlay and Darlington (1995)
16	isles of Calleja - peak of neurogenesis	Finlay and Darlington (1995)
17	neurogenesis cortical layer IV - peak (VC) of neurogenesis	Caviness (1982)
17	corpus callosum appears	Ashwell et al. (1996)
17	neurogenesis cortical layer IV - end (VC) of neurogenesis	Bayer and Altman (1991)
18.5	retinal ganglion cell generation - end of neurogenesis	Robinson and Dreher (1990)
19	initial differentiation of layer V (S1)	Finlay and Darlington (1995)
19	rods - peak of neurogenesis	Finlay and Darlington (1995)
21	complete separation of layer V (S1)	Rice et al. (1985)
22	onset of barrels (S1)	Rice et al. (1985)
22	onset of sublayers in layer V (S1)	Rice et al. (1985)
22	onset of trilaminar plate (S1)	Rice et al. (1985)
24	onset of barrel field septa (S1)	Rice et al. (1985)
25.5	ipsi/contra segregation in LGN and SC	Robinson and Dreher (1990)
30	eye opening	Dunlop et al. (1997)

== See also ==
- Brain development timelines
- Neural development
- http://www.translatingtime.net Translating Time: A website providing translation of brain developmental times among different species
