= Mossy fiber (hippocampus) =

Pathway in the hippocampus

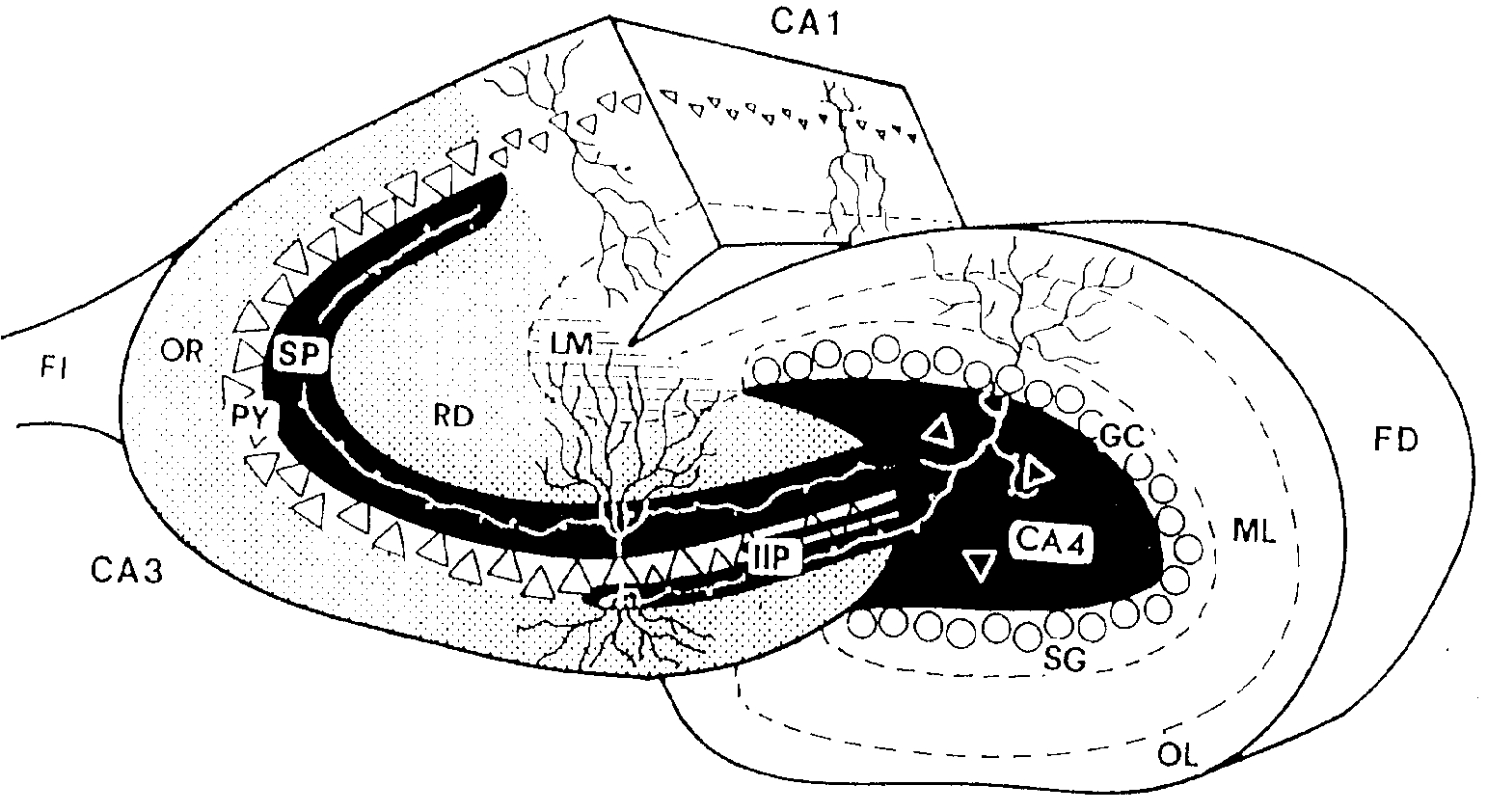
Diagram of a Timm-stained cross-section of the mouse hippocampus. The hippocampal subregion CA3–CA4 is indicated in black, stippled, and hatched areas. Black areas: suprapyramidal (SP), intra- and infrapyramidal (IIP) and hilar (CA4) mossy fiber terminal fields originating from the dentate gyrus. Stippled area: strata oriens (OR) and radiatum (RD). Hatched area: stratum lacunosum-moleculare (LM). CA1, subregion of the hippocampus without mossy fibers; FI, fimbria hippocampi; FD, fascia dentata; OL and ML, outer and middle molecular layers of the fascia dentata; SG, supragranular layer; GC, granular cells.

In the hippocampus, the mossy fiber pathway consists of unmyelinated axons projecting from granule cells in the dentate gyrus that terminate on modulatory hilar mossy cells and in CA3, a region involved in encoding short-term memory. These granule cell axons were first described as mossy fibers by Santiago Ramón y Cajal as they displayed varicosities along their lengths that gave them a mossy appearance. A similar morphology belongs to mossy fibers in the cerebellum.

The axons that make up the pathway emerge from the basal portions of the granule cells and pass through the hilus (or polymorphic cell layer) of the dentate gyrus before entering the stratum lucidum of hippocampal subfield CA3. Granule cell synapses tend to be glutamatergic (excitatory), though immunohistological data has indicated that some synapses contain neuropeptidergic elements including opiate peptides such as dynorphin and enkephalin. There is also evidence for co-localization of both GABAergic (inhibitory) and glutamatergic neurotransmitters within mossy fiber terminals. GABAergic and glutamatergic co-localization in mossy fiber boutons has been observed primarily in the developing hippocampus, but in adulthood, evidence suggests that mossy fiber synapses may alternate which neurotransmitter is released through activity-dependent regulation.

== Anatomy ==
Mossy cells in the dentate gyrus hilus make up a large proportion of the neurons in the dentate gyrus. The pathway consists of varicose granule cell axons (mossy fibers) that terminate on the dendrites of hilar mossy cells and pyramidal cells in CA3. They form three morphologically different synaptic terminals, which include large mossy terminals, filopodial extensions within the mossy terminals, and small en passant boutons. Each of these synapse types is functionally distinct.

=== Synaptic terminals ===
Mossy fibers form multiple synapses with the elaborate dendritic spines of CA3 pyramidal cells in the stratum lucidum of the hippocampus. These complex spines are known as thorny excrescences. Thorny excrescences also cover the proximal dendrites of mossy cells in the hilus. Hilar thorny excrescences are more dense and complex than those in CA3. It has been shown that the axons of granule cells from the dentate gyrus synapse with hilar mossy cells and GABAergic interneurons including basket cells before reaching pyramidal cells in the CA3 region, providing input from the entorhinal cortex through the perforant pathway. Hilar mossy cell activation is thought to be necessary for the proper function of these inhibitory basket cells on CA3 pyramidal cells, although evidence has shown that sodium channel receptors can regulate basket cell function as well.

The three synaptic terminals types – mossy terminals, filopodial extensions, and en passant synaptic varicosities – differ in synaptic output. Large mossy terminals synapse with 11–15 different CA3 pyramidal cells and 7–12 mossy cells. En passant boutons with 25–35 synaptic connections and filopodial extensions with 12–17 make up a significant portion of total granule cell synaptic terminals and are mainly responsible for the excitation of GABAergic interneurons. The type of synaptic terminal expressed therefore dictates the downstream targeting of granule cells. The high convergence onto pyramidal cells and divergent projections onto interneurons suggests a primarily modulatory role for the mossy fiber pathway in the hippocampus.

The synapses of the mossy fibers contain zinc, which can be stained with a Timm staining.

=== Projections ===
The dentate gyrus receives excitatory projections from neurons in layer II of the entorhinal cortex as well as input from surrounding neuroglia. The unmyelinated granule cell axons of the mossy fiber pathway express both GABA receptors and glutamate receptors along their membranes that allow them to be modulated by both excitatory and inhibitory input from nearby glial cells. Axons from the entorhinal cortex synapse primarily on the dendritic spines of outer layer dentate granule cells. The entorhinal cortex passes sensory information from neocortical structures to the hippocampal formation. The pathway allows sensory information to reach the hippocampus for encoding.

The mossy fiber pathway itself projects to CA3. Repetitive stimulation of its neurons leads to progressive use-dependent synaptic depression. These short-term changes in plasticity have been shown to be mediated by sodium channels that receive input from neuroglia. The entorhinal cortex also projects directly to CA3, suggesting that the mossy fiber pathway may be functionally similar to the perforant pathway although microcircuits within the dentate gyrus give the mossy fiber pathway a more modulatory role. Projections to the dentate hilus are excitatory by nature and oppose the inhibitory effects of interneurons on hilar mossy cells. The result is an excitatory feedforward loop on mossy cells as a result of activation by the entorhinal cortex.

== Role in learning and memory ==
In the mouse, a single mossy fiber projection may make as many as 37 contacts with a single pyramidal cell, but innervates only about a dozen different pyramidal cells. In contrast, a single CA3 pyramidal cell receives input from about 50 different granule cells. It has been shown in rodents that the size of the mossy fiber projections can show large interindividual variations, which are to a large part heritable. In addition, these variations show strong correlations with different types of behavior, mainly, but not exclusively, spatial learning.
