= EC-hippocampus system =

The entorhinal cortex (EC) is a major part of the hippocampal formation of the brain, and is reciprocally connected with the hippocampus.

The hippocampal formation, which consists of the hippocampus, perirhinal cortex, the dentate gyrus, the subicular areas and the EC forms one of the most important parts of the limbic system. The entorhinal cortex is an infolding of the parahippocampal gyrus into the inferior (temporal) horn of the lateral ventricle.

== Role in knowledge processing and memory ==
Studies, with human patients and with experimental animals, suggest that knowledge stored as explicit memory is first acquired through processing in one or more of the three polymodal association cortices (prefrontal, limbic, and parieto-occipital-temporal) to form visual, auditory and somatic information. From there, the information is then conveyed in series to the parahippocampal and perirhinal cortices, then onwards to the EC, dentate gyrus, hippocampus, subiculum and then finally back to the EC. From the EC, the information is sent back to the parahippocampal and perirhinal cortex, and finally back to the polymodal association areas of neocortex.

The EC has dual functions in processing information for explicit memory storage: First, it is the main input to the hippocampus. The EC projects to the dentate gyrus via the perforant pathway and by this means provides the critical input pathway in this area of the brain, linking the association cortices to the hippocampus. Second, the EC is also the major output of the hippocampus. The information coming to the hippocampus from both the poly- and unimodal association cortices, converge in the EC.

== Role in epilepsy ==
The entorhinal cortex and its links to the hippocampus have been implicated in the generation of seizures in temporal lobe epilepsy, one of the most common forms of epilepsy. This, coupled with the rich innervation of the hippocampus, is the reason why the EC is so widely studied by neurophysiologists and neuropharmacologists.
