= Memory and aging =

Aspect of senescence

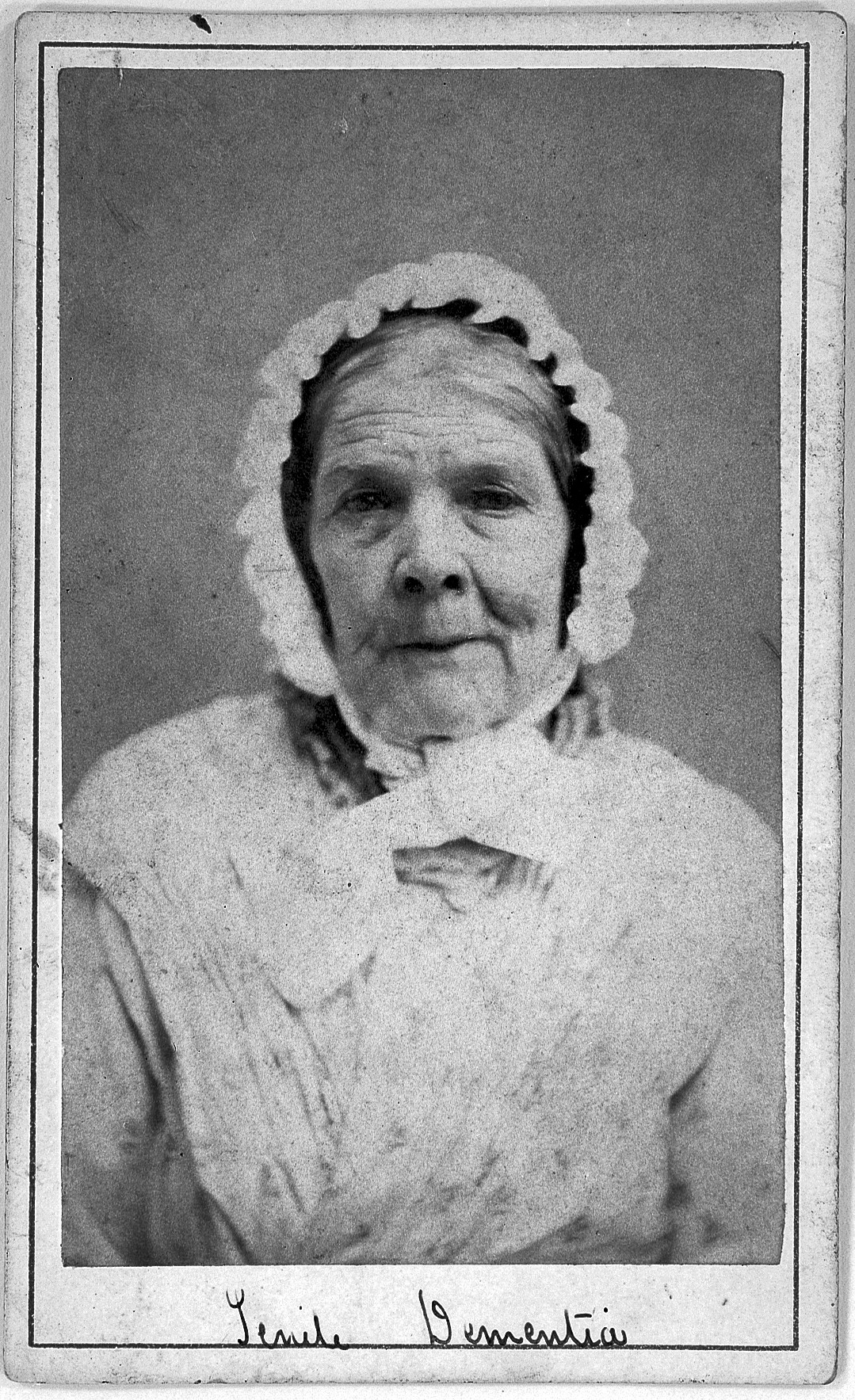
Woman with age-related dementia

Age-related memory loss, sometimes described as "normal aging" (also spelled "ageing" in British English), is qualitatively different from memory disorders associated with types of dementia such as Alzheimer's disease, and is believed to have a different brain mechanism.

== Mild cognitive impairment ==
Mild cognitive impairment (MCI) is a condition in which people face memory problems more often than that of the average person their age. These symptoms, however, do not prevent them from carrying out normal activities and are not as severe as the symptoms for Alzheimer's disease (AD). Symptoms often include misplacing items, forgetting events or appointments, and having trouble finding words.

According to recent research, MCI is seen as the transitional state between cognitive changes of normal aging and Alzheimer's disease. Several studies have indicated that individuals with MCI are at an increased risk for developing AD, ranging from one percent to twenty-five percent per year; in one study twenty-four percent of MCI patients progressed to AD in two years and twenty percent more over three years, whereas another study indicated that the progression of MCI subjects was fifty-five percent in four and a half years. Some patients with MCI, however, never progress to AD.

Studies have also indicated patterns that are found in both MCI and AD. Much like patients with Alzheimer's disease, those with mild cognitive impairment have difficulty accurately defining words and using them appropriately in sentences when asked. While MCI patients had a lower performance in this task than the control group, AD patients performed worse overall. The abilities of MCI patients stood out, however, due to the ability to provide examples to make up for their difficulties. AD patients failed to use any compensatory strategies and therefore exhibited the difference in use of episodic memory and executive functioning.

== Normal aging ==
Normal aging is associated with a decline in various memory abilities in many cognitive tasks; the phenomenon is known as age-related memory impairment (AMI) or age-associated memory impairment (AAMI). The ability to encode new memories of events or facts and working memory shows decline in both cross-sectional and longitudinal studies. Studies comparing the effects of aging on episodic memory, semantic memory, short-term memory and priming find that episodic memory is especially impaired in normal aging; some types of short-term memory are also impaired. The deficits may be related to impairments seen in the ability to refresh recently processed information.

Source information is one type of episodic memory that declines with old age; this kind of knowledge includes where and when the person learned the information. Knowing the source and context of information can be extremely important in daily decision-making, so this is one way in which memory decline can affect the lives of the elderly. Therefore, reliance on political stereotypes is one way to use their knowledge about the sources when making judgments, and the use of metacognitive knowledge gains importance. This deficit may be related to declines in the ability to bind information together in memory during encoding and retrieve those associations at a later time.

Throughout the many years of studying the progression of aging and memory, it has been hard to distinguish an exact link between the two. Many studies have tested psychologists theories throughout the years and they have found solid evidence that supports older adults having a harder time recalling contextual information while the more familiar or automatic information typically stays well preserved throughout the aging process (Light, 2000). Also, there is an increase of irrelevant information as one ages which can lead to an elderly person believing false information since they are often in a state of confusion.

Episodic memory is supported by networks spanning frontal, temporal, and parietal lobes. The interconnections in the lobes are presumed to enable distinct aspects of memory, whereas the effects of gray matter lesions have been extensively studied, less is known about the interconnecting fiber tracts. In aging, degradation of white matter structure has emerged as an important general factor, further focusing attention on the critical white matter connections.

Exercise affects many people young and old. For the young, if exercise is introduced it can form a constructive habit that can be instilled throughout adulthood. For the elderly, especially those with Alzheimer's or other diseases that affect the memory, when the brain is introduced to exercise the hippocampus is likely to retain its size and improve its memory.

It is also possible that the years of education a person has had and the amount of attention they received as a child might be a variable closely related to the links of aging and memory. There is a positive correlation between early life education and memory gains in older age. This effect is especially significant in women.

In particular, associative learning, which is another type of episodic memory, is vulnerable to the effects of aging, and this has been demonstrated across various study paradigms. This has been explained by the Associative Deficit Hypothesis (ADH), which states that aging is associated with a deficiency in creating and retrieving links between single units of information. This can include knowledge about context, events or items. The ability to bind pieces of information together with their episodic context in a coherent whole has been reduced in the elderly population. Furthermore, the older adults' performances in free recall involved temporal contiguity to a lesser extent than for younger people, indicating that associations regarding contiguity become weaker with age.

Several reasons have been speculated as to why older adults use less effective encoding and retrieval strategies as they age. The first is the "disuse" view, which states that memory strategies are used less by older adults as they move further away from the educational system. Second is the "diminished attentional capacity" hypothesis, which means that older people engage less in self-initiated encoding due to reduced attentional capacity. The third reason is the "memory self-efficacy," which indicates that older people do not have confidence in their own memory performances, leading to poor consequences. It is known that patients with Alzheimer's disease and patients with semantic dementia both exhibit difficulty in tasks that involve picture naming and category fluency. This is tied to damage to their semantic network, which stores knowledge of meanings and understandings.

One phenomenon, known as "Senior Moments", is a memory deficit that appears to have a biological cause. When an older adult is interrupted while completing a task, it is likely that the original task at hand can be forgotten. Studies have shown that the brain of an older adult does not have the ability to re-engage after an interruption and continues to focus on the particular interruption unlike that of a younger brain. This inability to multi-task is normal with aging and is expected to become more apparent with the increase of older generations remaining in the work field.

A biological explanation for memory deficits in aging includes a postmortem examination of five brains of elderly people with better memory than average. These people are called the "super aged," and it was found that these individuals had fewer fiber-like tangles of tau protein than in typical elderly brains. However, a similar amount of amyloid plaque was found.

More recent research has extended established findings of age related decline in executive functioning, by examining related cognitive processes that underlie healthy older adults' sequential performance. Sequential performance refers to the execution of a series steps needed to complete a routine, such as the steps required to make a cup of coffee or drive a car. An important part of healthy aging involves older adults' use of memory and inhibitory processes to carry out daily activities in a fixed order without forgetting the sequence of steps that were just completed while remembering the next step in the sequence. A study from 2009 examined how young and older adults differ in the underlying representation of a sequence of tasks and their efficiency at retrieving the information needed to complete their routine. Findings from this study revealed that when older and young adults had to remember a sequence of eight animal images arranged in a fixed order, both age groups spontaneously used the organizational strategy of chunking to facilitate retrieval of information. However, older adults were slower at accessing each chunk compared to younger adults, and were better able to benefit from the use of memory aids, such as verbal rehearsal to remember the order of the fixed sequence. Results from this study suggest that there are age differences in memory and inhibitory processes that affect people's sequence of actions and the use of memory aids could facilitate the retrieval of information in older age.

== Causes ==
The causes for memory issues and aging is still unclear, even after the many theories have been tested. There has yet to be a distinct link between the two because it is hard to determine exactly how each aspect of aging effects the memory and aging process. However, it is known that the brain shrinks with age due to the expansion of ventricles causing there to be little room in the head. Unfortunately, it is hard to provide a solid link between the shrinking brain and memory loss due to not knowing exactly which area of the brain has shrunk and what the importance of that area truly is in the aging process (Baddeley, Anderson, & Eysenck, 2015) Attempting to recall information or a situation that has happened can be very difficult since different pieces of information of an event are stored in different areas. During recall of an event, the various pieces of information are pieced back together again and any missing information is filled up by the brain, unconsciously which can account for why people sometimes receive and believe false information (Swaab, 2014).

Memory lapses can be both aggravating and frustrating but they are due to the overwhelming number of information that is being taken in by the brain. Issues in memory can also be linked to several common physical and psychological causes, such as: anxiety, dehydration, depression, infections, medication side effects, poor nutrition, vitamin B12 deficiency, psychological stress, substance abuse, chronic alcoholism, thyroid imbalances, and blood clots in the brain. Taking care of the body and mind with appropriate medication, doctoral check-ups, and daily mental and physical exercise can prevent some of these memory issues.

Some memory issues are due to stress, anxiety, or depression. A traumatic life event, such as the death of a spouse, can lead to changes in lifestyle and can leave an elderly person feeling unsure of themselves, sad, and lonely. Dealing with such drastic life changes can therefore leave some people confused or forgetful. While in some cases these feelings may fade, it is important to take these emotional problems seriously. By emotionally supporting a struggling relative and seeking help from a doctor or counselor, the forgetfulness can be improved.

Memory loss can come from different situations of trauma including accidents, head-injuries and even from situations of abuse in the past. Sometimes the memories of traumas can last a lifetime and other times they can be forgotten, intentionally or not, and the causes are highly debated throughout psychology. There is a possibility that the damage to the brain makes it harder for a person to encode and process information that should be stored in long-term memory (Nairne, 2000). There is support for environmental cues being helpful in recovery and retrieval of information, meaning that there is enough significance to the cue that it brings back the memory.

=== Theories ===
Tests and data show that as people age, the contiguity effect, which is stimuli that occur close together in the associated time, starts to weaken. This is supported by the associative deficit theory of memory, which access the memory performance of an elder person and is attributed to their difficulty in creating and retaining cohesive episodes. The supporting research in this test, after controlling for sex, education, and other health-related issues, show that greater age was associated with lower hit and greater false alarm rates, and also a more liberal bias response on recognition tests.

Older people have a higher tendency to make outside intrusions during a memory test. This can be attributed to the inhibition effect. Inhibition caused participants to take longer time in recalling or recognizing an item, and also subjected the participants to make more frequent errors. For instance, in a study using metaphors as the test subject, older participants rejected correct metaphors more often than literally false statements.

Working memory, which as previously stated is a memory system that stores and manipulates information as complete cognitive tasks are completed, demonstrates great declines during the aging process. There have been various theories offered to explain why these changes may occur, which include fewer attentional resources, slower speed of processing, less capacity to hold information, and lack of inhibitory control. All of these theories offer strong arguments, and it is likely that the decline in working memory is due to the problems cited in all of these areas.

Some theorists argue that the capacity of working memory decreases with age, and hence people are able to hold less information. In this theory, declines in working memory are described as the result of limiting the amount of information an individual can simultaneously keep active, so that a higher degree of integration and manipulation of information is not possible because the products of earlier memory processing are forgotten before the subsequent products.

Another theory that is being examined to explain age related declines in working memory is that there is a limit in attentional resources seen over age. This means that older individuals are less capable of dividing their attention between two tasks, and thus tasks with higher attentional demands are more difficult to complete due to a reduction in mental energy. Tasks that are simple and more automatic, however, see fewer declines from age. Working memory tasks often involve divided attention, thus they are more likely to strain the limited resources of aging individuals.

Speed of processing is another theory that has been raised to explain working memory deficits. As a result of various studies he has completed examining this topic, Salthouse argues that as one ages, the speed of processing information decreases significantly. It is this decrease in processing speed that is then responsible for the inability to use working memory efficiently as one ages. The younger persons brain is able to obtain and process information at a quicker rate which allows for subsequent integration and manipulation needed to complete the cognitive task at hand. As this processing slows, cognitive tasks that rely on quick processing speed then become more difficult.

Finally, the theory of inhibitory control has been offered to account for decline seen in working memory. This theory examines the idea that older adults are unable to suppress irrelevant information in working memory, and thus the capacity for relevant information is subsequently limited. Less space for new stimuli due may attribute to the declines seen in an individual's working memory as they age.

As the aging process continues, deficits are seen in the ability to integrate, manipulate, and reorganize the contents of working memory in order to complete higher level cognitive tasks such as problem solving, decision making, goal setting, and planning. More research must be completed in order to determine what the exact cause of these age-related deficits in working memory are. It is likely that attention, processing speed, capacity reduction, and inhibitory control may all play a role in these age-related deficits. The brain regions that are active during working memory tasks are also being evaluated, and research has shown that different parts of the brain are activated during working memory in younger adults as compared to older adults. This suggests that younger and older adults are performing these tasks differently.

== Types of studies ==
There are two different methods for studying the ways aging and memory effect each other which are cross-sectional and longitudinal. Both methods have been used multiple times in the past, but they both have advantages and disadvantages. Cross-sectional studies include testing different groups of people at different ages on a single occasion. This is where most of the evidence for studies including memory and aging come from. The disadvantage of cross-sectional studies is not being able to compare current data to previous data, or make a prediction about the future data. Longitudinal studies include testing the same group of participants the same number of times, over many years which are carefully selected in order to reflect upon a full range of a population (Ronnlund, Nyberg, Backman, & Nilsson; Ronnlund & Nilsson, 2006). The advantage to longitudinal studies include being able to see the effects that aging has on performance for each participant and even being able to distinguish early signs of memory related diseases. However, this type of study can be very costly and timely which might make it more likely to have participants drop out over the course of the study. (Baddeley, Anderson, & Eysenck, 2015).

== Mechanism research ==
A deficiency of the RbAp48 protein has been associated with age-related memory loss.

In 2010, experiments that have tested for the significance of under-performance of memory for an older adult group as compared to a young adult group, hypothesized that the deficit in associate memory due to age can be linked with a physical deficit. This deficit can be explained by the inefficient processing in the medial-temporal regions. This region is important in episodic memory, which is one of the two types of long-term human memory, and it contains the hippocampi, which are crucial in creating memorial association between items.

Age-related memory loss is believed to originate in the dentate gyrus, whereas Alzheimer's is believed to originate in the entorhinal cortex.

During normal aging, oxidative DNA damage in the brain accumulates in the promoters of genes involved in learning and memory, as well as in genes involved in neuronal survival. Oxidative DNA damage includes DNA single-strand breaks which can give rise to DNA double-strand breaks (DSBs). DSBs accumulate in neurons and astrocytes of the hippocampus and frontal cortex at early stages and during the progression to Alzheimer's disease, a process that could be an important driver of neurodegeneration and cognitive decline.

== Prevention and treatment ==
Various actions have been suggested to prevent memory loss or even improve memory.

The Mayo Clinic has suggested seven steps: stay mentally active, socialize regularly, get organized, eat a healthy diet, include physical activity in one's daily routine, and manage chronic conditions. Because some of the causes of memory loss include medications, stress, depression, heart disease, excessive alcohol use, thyroid problems, vitamin B12 deficiency, not drinking enough water, and not eating nutritiously, fixing those problems could be a simple, effective way to slow down dementia. Some say that exercise is the best way to prevent memory problems, because that would increase blood flow to the brain and perhaps help new brain cells grow.

The treatment will depend on the cause of memory loss, but various drugs to treat Alzheimer's disease have been suggested in recent years. There are four drugs currently approved by the Food and Drug Administration (FDA) for the treatment of Alzheimer's, and they all act on the cholinergic system: Donepezil, Galantamine, Rivastigmine, and Tacrine. Although these medications are not the cure for Alzheimer's, symptoms may be reduced for up to eighteen months for mild or moderate dementia. These drugs do not forestall the ultimate decline to full Alzheimer's.

Also, modality is important in determining the strength of the memory. For instance, auditory creates stronger memory abilities than visual. This is shown by the higher recency and primacy effects of an auditory recall test compared to that of a visual test. Research has shown that auditory training, through instrumental musical activity or practice, can help preserve memory abilities as one ages. Specifically, in Hanna-Pladdy and McKay's experiment, they tested and found that the number of years of musical training, all things equal, leads to a better performance in non-verbal memory and increases the life span on cognition abilities in one's advanced years.

=== Caregiving ===
By keeping the patient active, focusing on their positive abilities, and avoiding stress, these tasks can easily be accomplished. Routines for bathing and dressing must be organized in a way so that the individual still feels a sense of independence. Simple approaches such as finding clothes with large buttons, elastic waist bands, or Velcro straps can ease the struggles of getting dressed in the morning. Further, finances should be managed or have a trusted individual appointed to manage them. Changing passwords to prevent over-use and involving a trusted family member or friend in managing accounts can prevent financial issues. When household chores begin to pile up, find ways to break down large tasks into small, manageable steps that can be rewarded. Finally, talking with and visiting a family member or friend with memory issues is very important. Using a respectful and simple approach, talking one-on-one can ease the pain of social isolation and bring much mental stimulation. Many people who experience memory loss and other cognitive impairments can have changes in behaviors that are challenging to deal with for care givers. See also Caregiver stress. To help, caregivers should learn different ways to communicate and to deescalate possibly aggressive situations. Because decision-making skills can be impaired, it can be beneficial to give simple commands instead of asking multiple questions. See also Caring for People with Dementia. Caregiving can be a physically, mentally, and emotionally taxing job to take on. A caregiver also needs to remember to care for themselves, taking breaks, finding time to themselves and possibly joining a support group are a few ways to avoid burnout.

== Domains of memory spared vs. affected ==
In contrast, implicit, or procedural memory, typically shows no decline with age. Other types of short-term memory show little decline, and semantic knowledge (e.g. vocabulary) actually improves with age. In addition, the enhancement seen in memory for emotional events is also maintained with age.

Losing working memory has been cited as being the primary reason for a decline in a variety of cognitive tasks due to aging. These tasks include long-term memory, problem solving, decision making, and language. Working memory involves the manipulation of information that is being obtained, and then using this information to complete a task. For example, the ability of one to recite numbers they have just been given backwards requires working memory, rather than just simple rehearsal of the numbers which would require only short-term memory. One's ability to tap into one's working memory declines as the aging process progresses. It has been seen that the more complex a task is, the more difficulty the aging person has with completing this task. Active reorganization and manipulation of information becomes increasingly harder as adults age. When an older individual is completing a task, such as having a conversation or doing work, they are using their working memory to help them complete this task. As they age, their ability to multi-task seems to decline; thus after an interruption it is often more difficult for an aging individual to successfully finish the task at hand. Additionally, working memory plays a role in the comprehension and production of speech. There is often a decline in sentence comprehension and sentence production as individuals age. Rather than linking this decline directly to deficits in linguistic ability, it is actually deficits in working memory that contribute to these decreasing language skills.

=== Visual memory ===
Studies have shown that with aging, in terms of short-term visual memory, viewing time and task complexity affect performance. When there is a delay or when the task is complex recall declines. In a study conducted to measure whether visual memory in older adults with age-related visual decline was caused by memory performance or visual functioning, the following were examined: relationships among age, visual activity, and visual and verbal memory in 89 community dwelling volunteers aged 60–87 years. The findings were that the effect of vision was not specific to visual memory. Therefore, vision was found to be correlated with general memory function in older adults and is not modality specific.

Performance in regards to spatial configurations deteriorates with aging. In a task to store and combine two different spatial configurations to form a novel one, young people out-performed the elderly. Vision also has an effect on performance. Sighted participants outperformed the visually impaired regardless of testing modality. This suggests that vision tends to shape the general supramodal mechanisms of memory.

== Qualitative changes ==
Most research on memory and aging has focused on how older adults perform worse at a particular memory task. However, researchers have also discovered that simply saying that older adults are doing the same thing, only less of it, is not always accurate. In some cases, older adults seem to be using different strategies than younger adults. For example, brain imaging studies have revealed that older adults are more likely to use both hemispheres when completing memory tasks than younger adults. In addition, older adults sometimes show a positivity effect when remembering information, which seems to be a result of the increased focus on regulating emotion seen with age. For instance, eye tracking reveals that older adults showed preferential looking toward happy faces and away from sad faces.

== See also ==
- Autobiographical memory and aging
- Aging brain
