= Brodmann area 28 =

Subdivision of the cerebral cortex

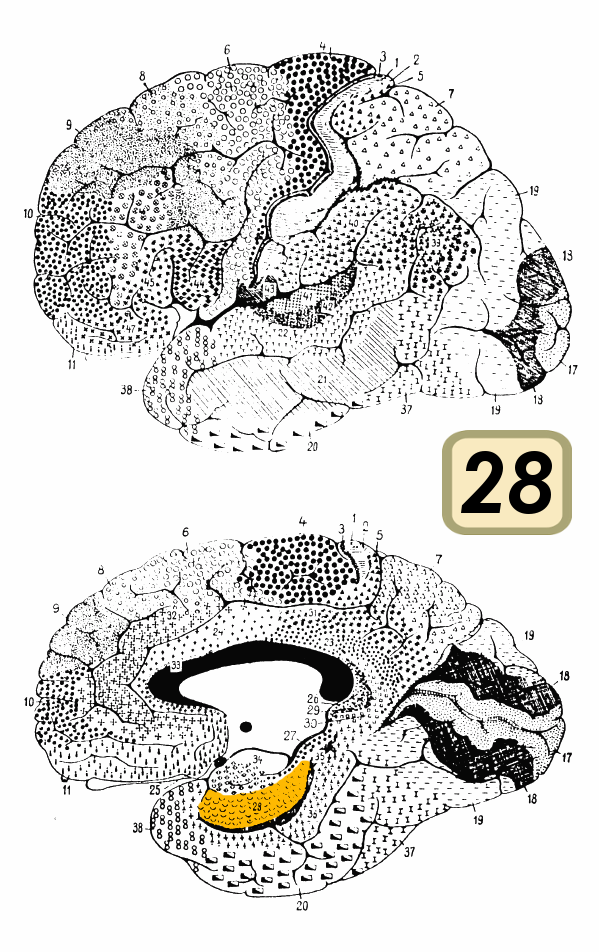

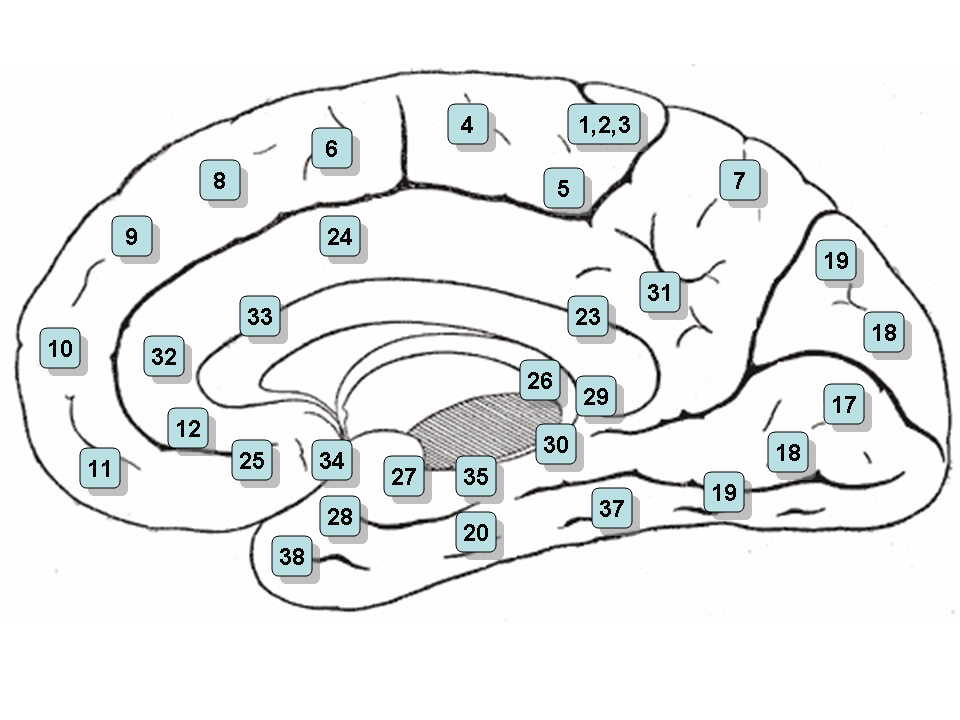
- Medial surface of the brain with Brodmann's areas numbered.

Details

Identifiers
- Latin: area entorhinalis ventralis
- NeuroNames: 1030
- NeuroLex ID: birnlex_2709
- FMA: 68625

Brodmann area 28 is a subdivision of the cerebral cortex defined on the basis of cytoarchitecture. It is located on the medial aspect of the temporal lobe and is part of the entorhinal cortex

== Human ==
In humans, Brodmann area 28, and Brodmann area 34 together constitute approximately the entorhinal cortex.

== Guenon ==
Brodmann regarded the location of area 28 adjacent to the hippocampus as imprecisely represented in the illustration of the cortex of the guenon brain in Brodmann-1909. It is located on the medial aspect of the temporal lobe.

== Distinctive features ==
The molecular layer (I) is unusually wide; the external granular layer (II) contains nests of, for the most part, multipolar cells: the external pyramidal layer (III) contains medium-sized pyramidal cells which merge with cells of the internal pyramidal layer (V); a clear cell free zone represents sublayer 5b of layer V; the multiform layer is wide and has a less clear two sublayer structure; the internal granular layer (IV) is totally absent.

== See also ==
- Brodmann area
- List of regions in the human brain
