= Brain development timelines =

Brain development in different species

These are timelines of brain development events in different animal species.

- Mouse brain development timeline
- Macaque brain development timeline
- Human brain development timeline

== See also ==
- Encephalization quotient
- Evolution of the brain
- Neural development
