= Hippocampal formation =

Region of the temporal lobe in mammalian brains

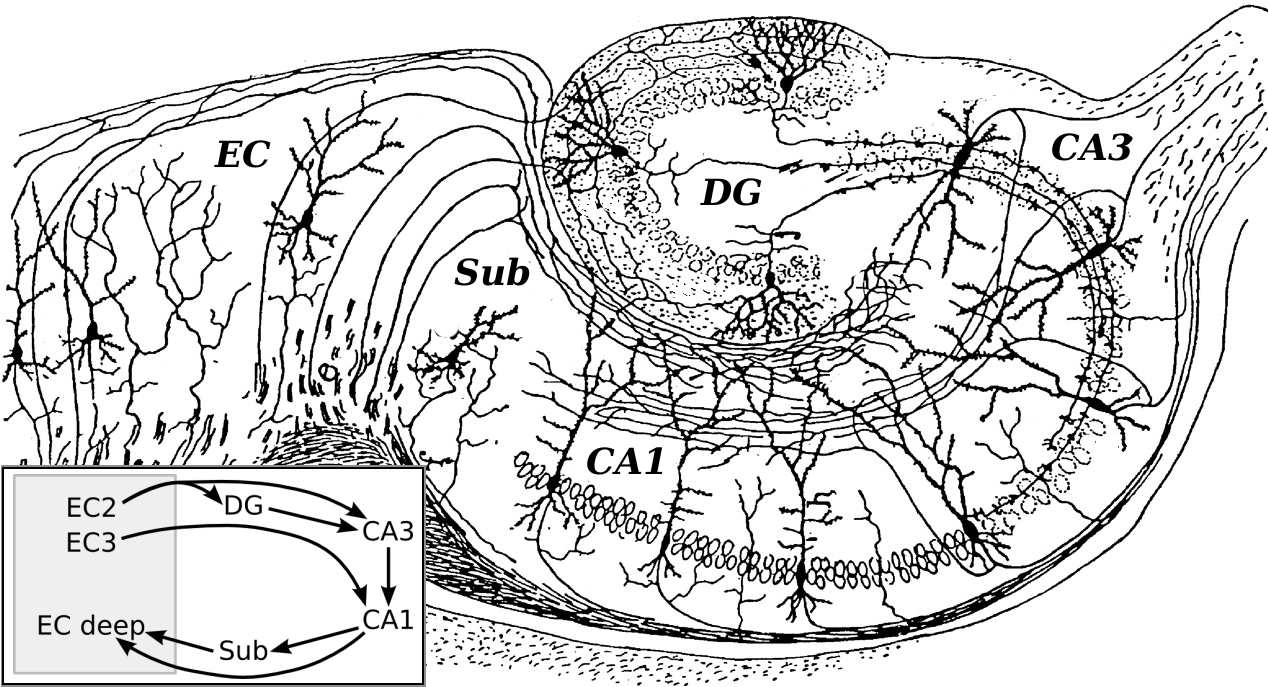
- The hippocampal formation, as drawn by Santiago Ramon y Cajal: DG: dentate gyrus. Sub: subiculum. EC: entorhinal cortex. CA1-CA3: hippocampal subfields

Details
- Part of: Temporal lobe

Identifiers
- Latin: formatio hippocampi
- NeuroNames: 177
- NeuroLex ID: birnlex_7151
- FMA: 74038

The hippocampal formation is a compound structure in the medial temporal lobe of the brain. It forms a c-shaped bulge on the floor of the inferior horn of the lateral ventricle. Typically, the hippocampal formation is said to include the dentate gyrus, the hippocampus, and the subiculum. The presubiculum, parasubiculum, and the entorhinal cortex may also be included. The hippocampal formation is thought to play a role in memory, spatial navigation and control of attention. The neural layout and pathways within the hippocampal formation are very similar in all mammals.

== History and function ==
During the nineteenth and early twentieth centuries, based largely on the observation that, between species, the size of the olfactory bulb varies with the size of the parahippocampal gyrus, the hippocampal formation was thought to be part of the olfactory system.

In 1937, Papez theorized that a circuit (the Papez circuit) including the hippocampal formation constitutes the neural substrate of emotional behavior, and Klüver and Bucy reported that, in monkeys, surgical removal of the hippocampal formation and the amygdaloid complex has a profound effect on emotional responses. As a consequence of these publications, the idea that the hippocampal formation is entirely dedicated to olfaction began to recede.

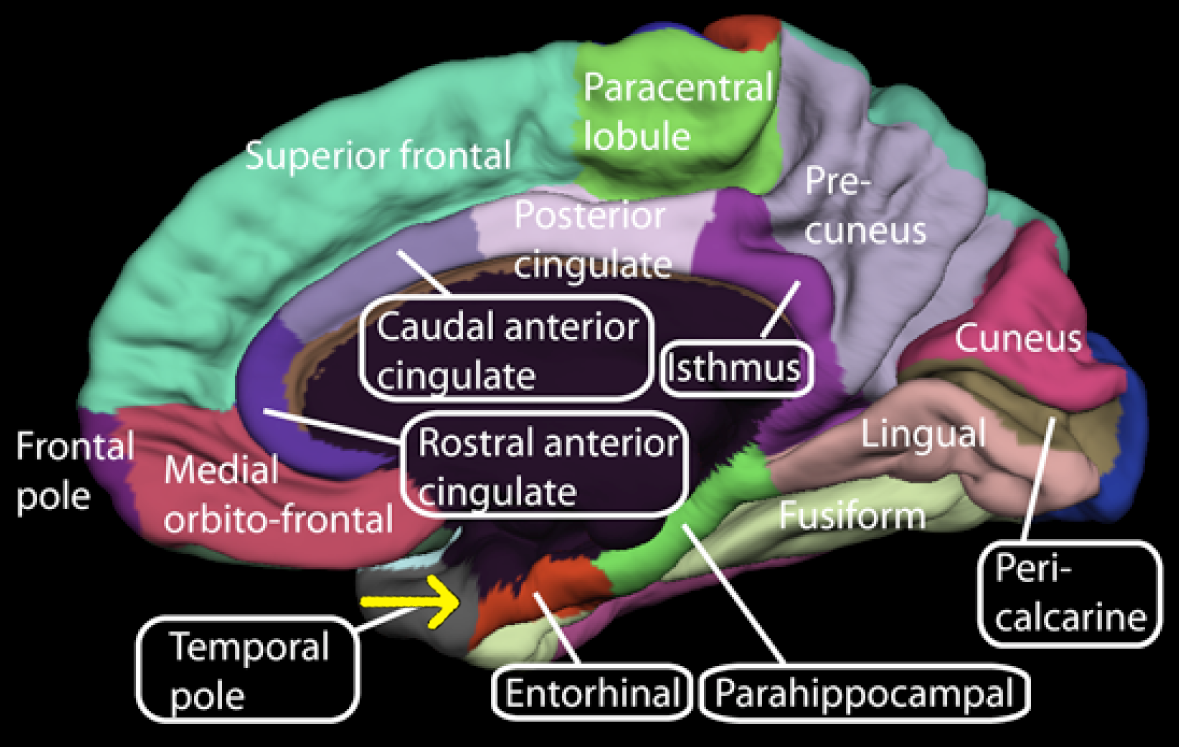
Medial (inner) surface of the right hemisphere of a human brain

In an influential 1947 review, Alf Brodal pointed out that mammal species thought to have no sense of smell nevertheless have fully intact hippocampal formations, that removal of the hippocampal formation did not affect the ability of dogs to perform tasks dependent on olfaction, and that no fibers were actually known that carry information directly from the olfactory bulb to any part of the hippocampal formation. Though massive direct input from the olfactory bulb to the entorhinal cortex has subsequently been found, the current view is that the hippocampal formation is not an integral part of the olfactory system.

In 1900, the Russian neurologist Vladimir Bekhterev described two patients with a significant memory deficit who, on autopsy, were found to have softening of hippocampal and adjacent cortical tissue; and, in 1957, William Beecher Scoville and Brenda Milner reported memory loss in a series of patients subsequent to their removal of the patients' medial temporal lobes. Thanks to these observations and a great deal of subsequent research, it is now broadly accepted that the hippocampal formation plays a role in some aspects of memory.

EEG evidence from 1938 to the present, stimulation evidence from the 1950s, and modern imaging techniques together suggest a role for some part of the hippocampal formation (in concert with the anterior cingulate cortex) in the control of attention.

In 1971, John O'Keefe and his student Jonathan Dostrovsky discovered place cells: neurons in the rat hippocampus whose activity relates to the animal's location within its environment. Despite skepticism from other investigators, O'Keefe and his co-workers, including Lynn Nadel, continued to investigate this question, in a line of work that eventually led to their very influential 1978 book The Hippocampus as a Cognitive Map. The discovery of place cells, together with the discovery of grid cells by May-Britt Moser and Edvard Moser, and the mapping of the function of the hippocampal formation in spatial awareness, led to the joint award of the Nobel Prize in Physiology or Medicine in 2014. In addition to place cells and grid cells, two further classes of spatial cell have since been identified in the hippocampal formation: head direction cells and boundary cells. As with the memory theory, there is now almost universal agreement that the hippocampal formation plays an important role in spatial coding, but the details are widely debated.
