= Brodmann area 34 =

Region of the brain

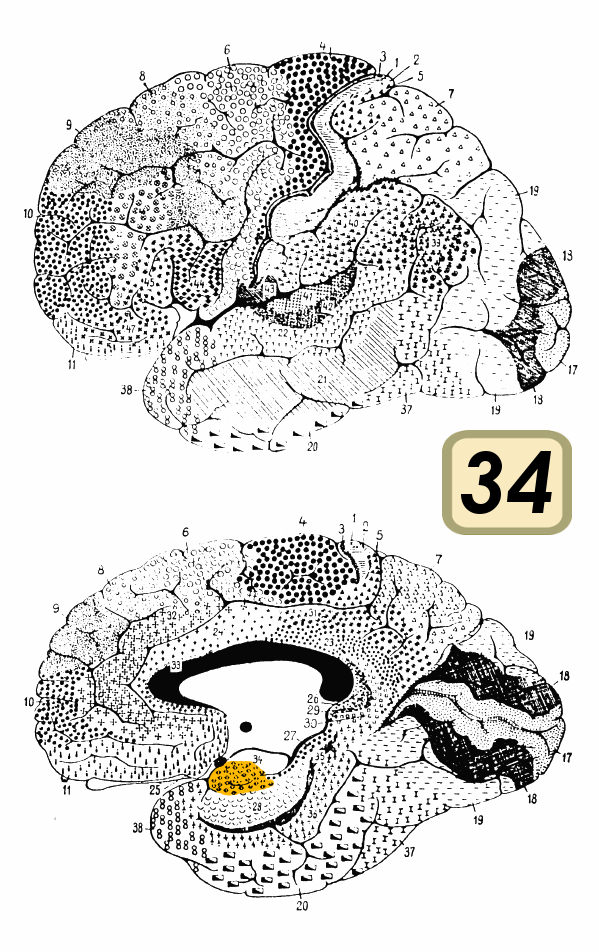

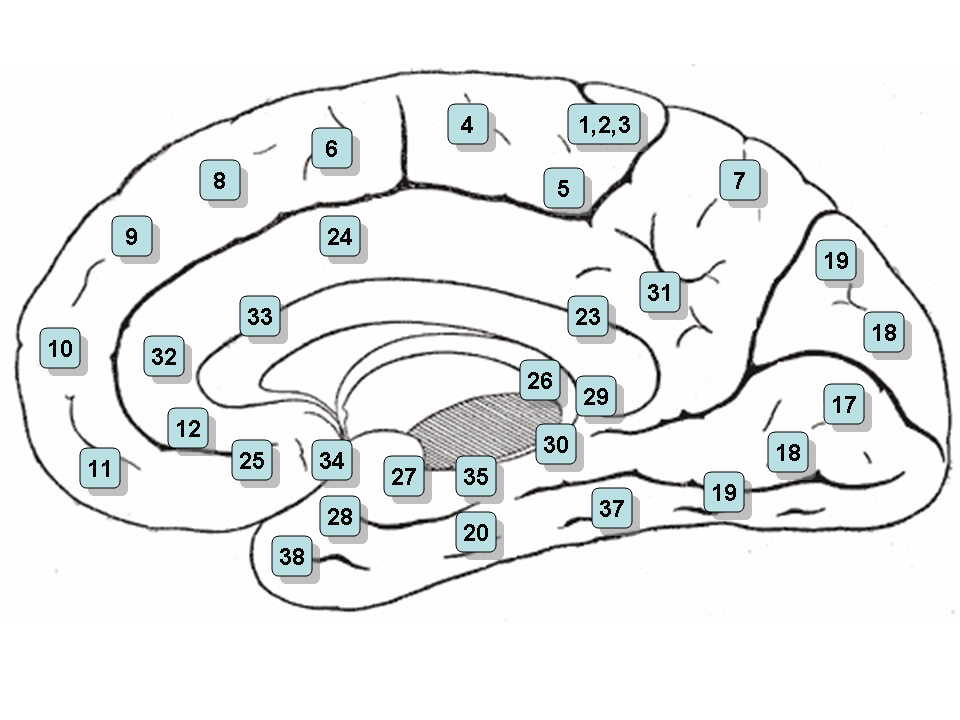
- Medial surface of the brain with Brodmann's areas numbered.

Details

Identifiers
- Latin: area entorhinalis dorsalis
- NeuroLex ID: birnlex_1767
- FMA: 68631

Brodmann area 34 is a region of the brain.

It is, together with Brodmann area 28, part of the entorhinal area and the superior temporal gyrus.

The entorhinal area is the main interface between the hippocampus and neocortex and involved in memory, navigation and the perception of time. Destruction of Brodmann area 34 results in ipsilateral anosmia.

== See also ==
- Brodmann area
