= Parasubiculum =

Major component of the subicular cortex

Identifiers
- NeuroLex ID: nlx_anat_091002
- TA98: A14.1.09.322
- FMA: 77604

In the rodent, the parasubiculum is a retrohippocampal isocortical structure, and a major component of the subicular complex. It receives numerous subcortical and cortical inputs, and sends major projections to the superficial layers of the entorhinal cortex (Amaral & Witter, 1995).

The parasubicular area is a transitional zone between the presubiculum and the entorhinal area in the mouse (Paxinos-2001), the rat (Swanson, 1998) and the primate (Zilles, 1990). Defined on the basis of cytoarchitecture, it is more similar to the presubiculum than to the entorhinal area (Zilles, 1990), however electrophysiological evidence suggests a similarity with the entorhinal cortex (Funahashi and Stewart, 1997; Glasgow & Chapman, 2007). To be specific, cells in this area are modulated by local theta rhythm, and display theta-frequency membrane potential oscillations (Glasgow & Chapman, 2007; Taube, 1995). Furthermore, cells in the parasubiculum, and neighboring presubiculum, fire in relation to the animal's location in space, suggesting properties similar to place cells. It is postulated that this area may play an integral role in spatial navigation and the integration of head-directional information (Chrobak & Buzsáki, 1994; Taube, 1995).

== See also ==
- Brodmann area
- Subiculum
