= Stratum lucidum of hippocampus =

Layer of the hippocampus

Details

Identifiers
- Latin: stratum lucidum hippocampi
- NeuroNames: 1777
- NeuroLex ID: birnlex_4108

The stratum lucidum of the hippocampus is a layer of the hippocampus between the stratum pyramidale and the stratum radiatum. It is the tract of the mossy fiber projections, both inhibitory and excitatory from the granule cells of the dentate gyrus. One mossy fiber may make up to 37 connections to a single pyramidal cell, and innervate around 12 pyramidal cells on top of that. Any given pyramidal cell in the stratum lucidum may get input from as many as 50 granule cells.

== Location ==
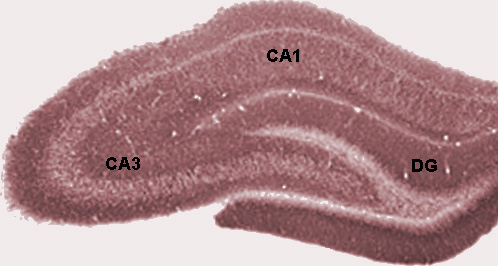
Diagram of hippocampal regions in a rat brain. Hippocampus anatomy

The stratum lucidum is located within the CA3 region of the hippocampus distally to the dentate gyrus and proximally to the CA2 region. It is composed of a densely packed bundle of mossy fibers (unmyelinated) and spiny and aspiny interneurons that lie immediately above the CA3 pyramidal cell layer in the hippocampus, and immediately below the stratum radiatum. Most mossy fiber axons are perpendicular to the CA3 pyramidal region where they project and synapse to either the CA3 pyramidal cells or the stratum oriens below the pyramidal region. The interneurons of the stratum lucidum are generally found to be local circuit neurons remaining within the CA3 region. A majority of the interneuron axons remain within the stratum lucidum but some also extend to the stratum radiatum and stratum lacunosum-molecular above the radiatum as well as to the CA1 and hilar regions.

== Composition ==
=== Stratum pyramidale ===
In hippocampus anatomy, the stratum pyramidale is one of seven layers, or stratums, that make up the entire neural structure. The stratum pyramidale is the third deepest hippocampal layer, and in relation to the stratum lucidum, is located underneath it. The stratum pyramidale houses cell bodies of the pyramidal neurons, which are the foundational excitatory neurons of the hippocampus. In the CA3 region of the hippocampus, the stratum pyramidale connects with the stratum lucidum by mossy fibers that run through both subfields.

=== Stratum radiatum ===
The layer above the stratum lucidum.

=== Interneurons ===
The types of neurons found in the stratum lucidum are called interneurons, neurons which form a connection between other neurons in a different location. This situation is described in the mossy fiber axon connection in the CA3 stratum lucidum region of the hippocampus as is in relation to Purkinje cells. The interneurons found in the stratum lucidum are of two classes, spiny and aspiny.

Spiny neurons are a "special type of inhibitory cell", characterized by spiny projections on the dendrites of the cell. The axons of these neurons in the hippocampus terminate primarily in the stratum lucidum and stratum radiatum of CA3. Spiny neurons are of importance because of their "pivotal role in motor control, habit formation, and motivated behavior". They receive synaptic inputs from mossy fibers boutons, as well as multiple other synaptic terminals. The majority of axon collaterals of these neurons remain in the stratum lucidum and CA3 region, though in some cases axon collaterals of these neurons are observed migrating into the CA1 region of the hippocampus.

Aspiny neurons, the second class of neurons found in the stratum lucidum, are another type of inhibitory cell similar to spiny neurons, though lacking dendrite projections. They make up the majority of the neuron composition in comparison to spiny neurons, about 63 percent. The somata of aspiny neurons are for the most part bipolar, generating 2–5 primary dendrites "that to a varying extent displayed varicose swellings in their course". Similar to spiny neurons, aspiny neuron dendrites "branch extensively in stratum lucidum and stratum radiatum of CA3", in contrast to spiny neurons, however, some dendrites "traversed stratum pyramidale and entered stratum oriens", the second deepest layer of the hippocampus. Additionally, what distinguishes aspiny neurons from spiny neurons is their higher maximal firing rates and narrower action potential half-widths than their spiny counterparts.

== Function within the nervous system ==
In the hippocampus, the stratum lucidum contains many neurons that act locally in local pathways. The spiny neurons of the stratum lucidum act in primary motor control as interneurons that relay to other neurons. The spiny and aspiny neurons act in both inhibitory and excitatory circuits.
