= Brodmann area 27 =

Rostral part of the parahippocampal gyrus

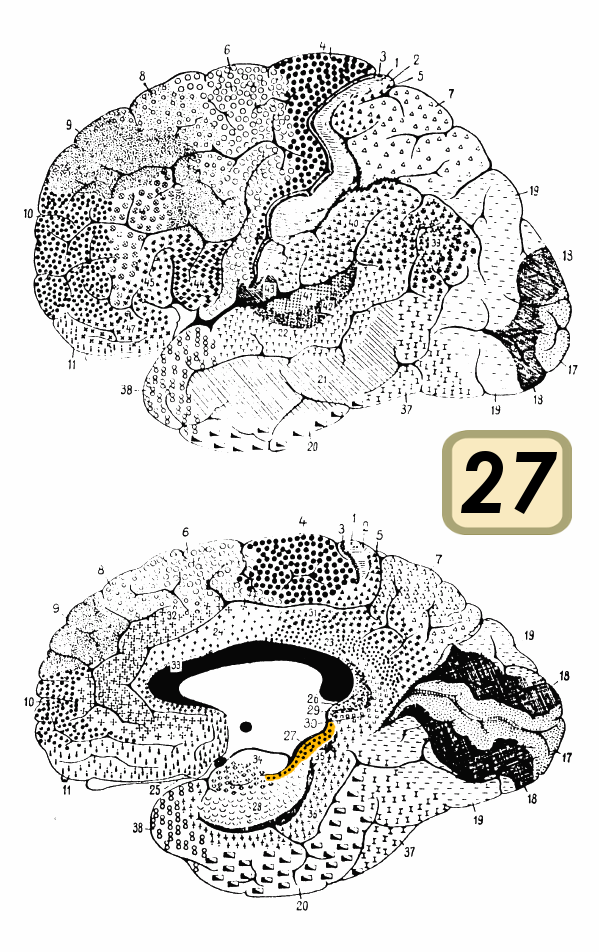

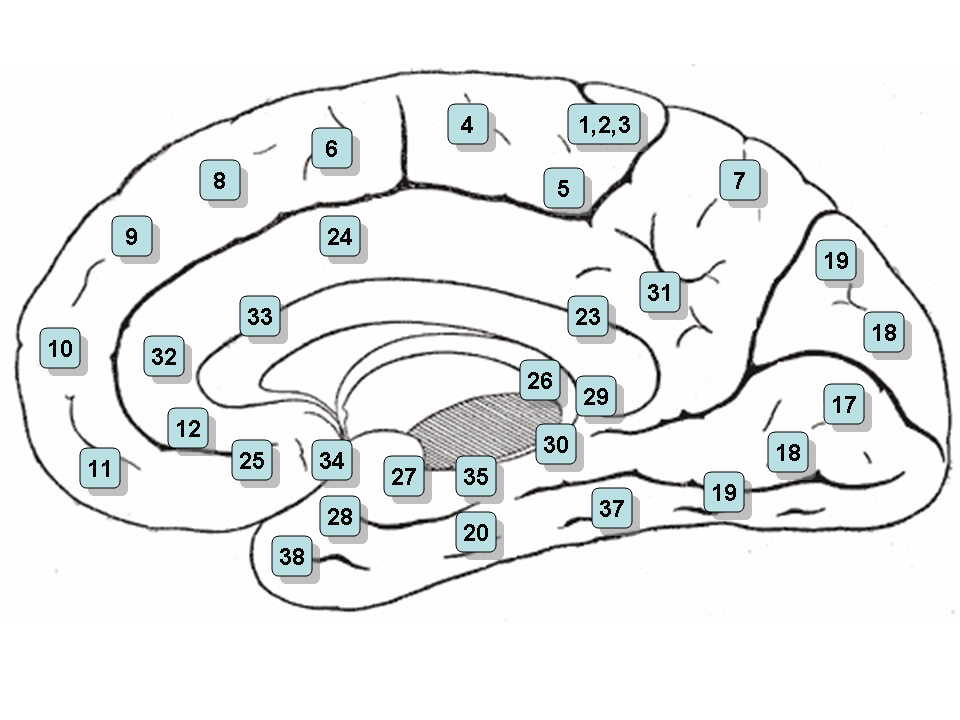
- Medial surface of the brain with Brodmann's areas numbered.

Details

Identifiers
- Latin: area praesubicularis
- NeuroNames: 1039
- NeuroLex ID: birnlex_1758
- FMA: 68624

Brodmann area 27 is a cytoarchitecturally defined cortical area that is a rostral part of the parahippocampal gyrus. It is commonly regarded as a synonym of presubiculum.

The dorsal part of the presubiculum is more commonly known as the postsubiculum, and is of interest because it contains head direction cells, which are responsive to the facing direction of the head.

== See also ==
- Brodmann area
- List of regions in the human brain
