= Subiculum =

Most inferior part of the hippocampal formation

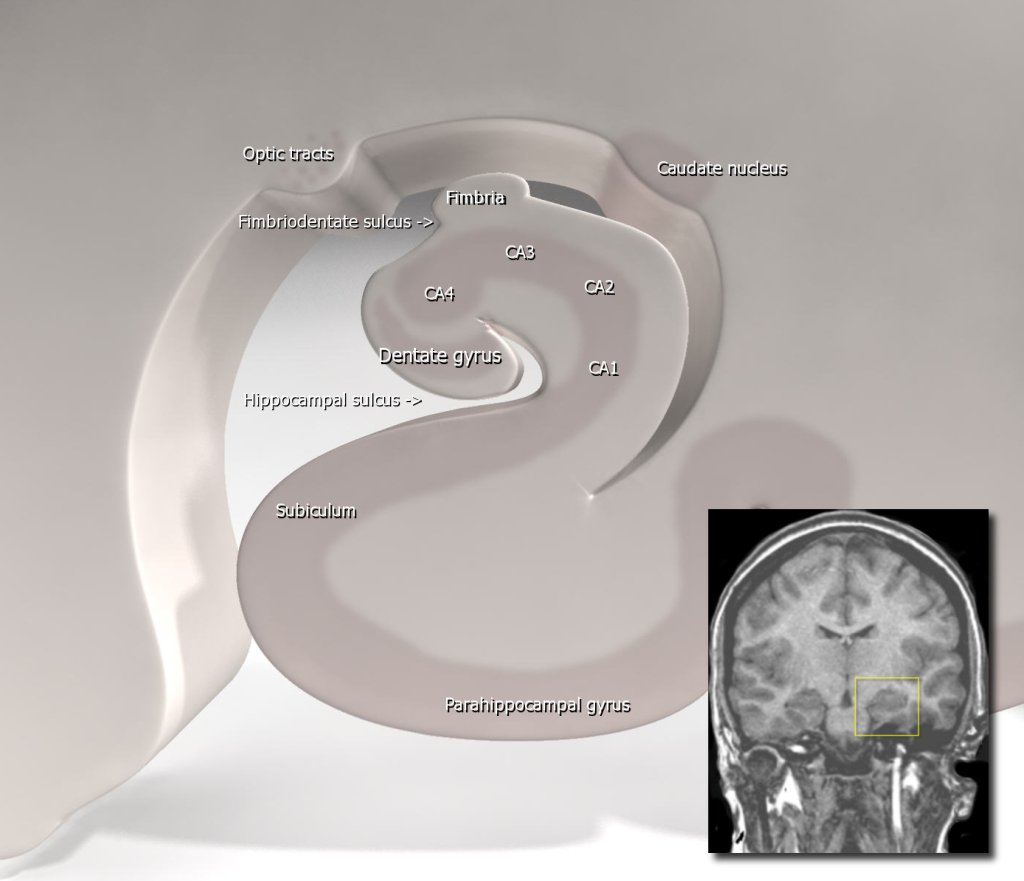
- Subiculum labeled at center left (coronal brain slice).

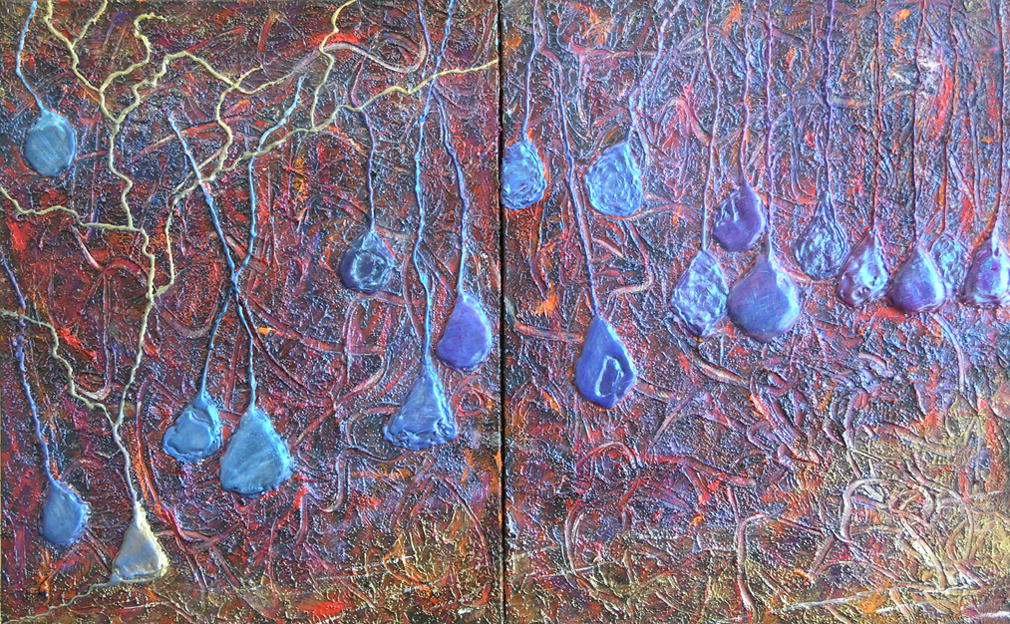
- CA1 transition to subiculum Artist Don Cooper and Leah Leverich

Details
- Part of: Temporal lobe
- Artery: Posterior cerebral Anterior choroidal

Identifiers
- NeuroNames: 188
- NeuroLex ID: birnlex_1305
- TA98: A14.1.09.326
- TA2: 5519
- FMA: 74414

The subiculum (Latin for "support") also known as the subicular complex, or subicular cortex, is the most inferior component of the hippocampal formation. It lies between the entorhinal cortex and the CA1 hippocampal subfield.

The subicular complex comprises a set of four related structures including the prosubiculum, presubiculum, postsubiculum and parasubiculum.

== Name ==
The subiculum got its name from Karl Friedrich Burdach in his three-volume work Vom Bau und Leben des Gehirns (Vol. 2, §199). He originally named it subiculum cornu ammonis and so associated it with the rest of the hippocampal subfields.

== Structure ==
The subicular complex receives input from CA1 and entorhinal cortical layer III pyramidal neurons and is the main output of the hippocampus proper. The pyramidal neurons send projections to the nucleus accumbens, septal nuclei, prefrontal cortex, lateral hypothalamus, nucleus reuniens, mammillary nuclei, entorhinal cortex and amygdala.

The pyramidal neurons in the subiculum exhibit transitions between two modes of action potential output: bursting and single spiking. The transitions between these two modes is thought to be important for routing information out of the hippocampus.

Four component areas have been described: parasubiculum (adjacent to the parahippocampal gyrus), presubiculum, postsubiculum, and prosubiculum.

=== Parasubiculum ===
The parasubiculum contains grid cells, which are neurons responsive to movements in particular directions over particular distances.

=== Presubiculum ===
The presubiculum is part of the posterior cortex corresponding to Brodmann area 27, and forms part of the cortical input to the entorhinal-hippocampal spatial/memory system.

==== Postsubiculum ====
The dorsal part of the presubiculum is more commonly known as the postsubiculum and is of interest because it contains head direction cells, which are responsive to the facing direction of the head.

=== Prosubiculum ===
Prosubiculum is a term often used in reference to monkey anatomy but rarely in rodents, referring to a region located between the CA1 region of the hippocampus and the subiculum, and distinguished by higher cell density and smaller cell sizes.

== Function ==
It is believed to play a role in some cases of human epilepsy.

It has also been implicated in working memory and drug addiction.

It has been suggested that the dorsal subiculum is involved in spatial relations, and the ventral subiculum regulates the hypothalamic-pituitary-adrenal axis.

== Clinical significance ==
=== Potential role in Alzheimer's disease ===
Rat studies indicate that lesioning of the subiculum decreases the spread of amyloid-beta in rat models of Alzheimer's disease. Alzheimer's disease pathology is thought to have prion-like properties. The disease tends to spread in characteristic sequence from the entorhinal cortex through the subiculum.

== Additional images ==
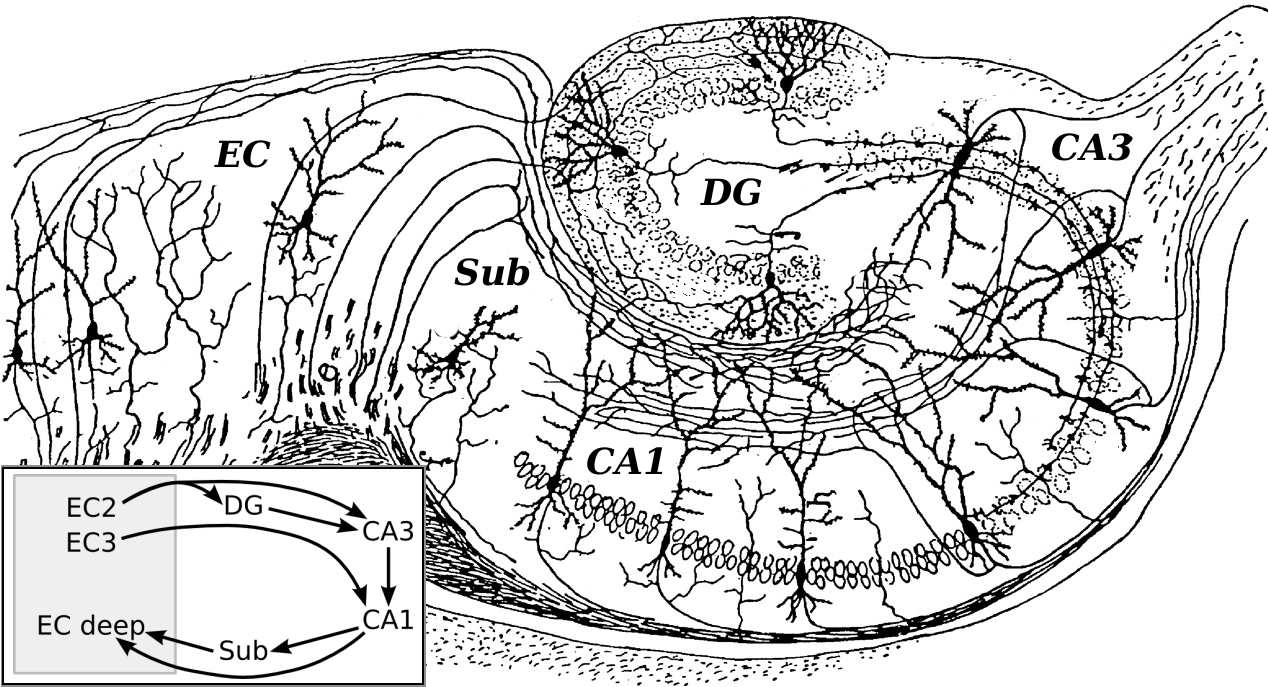
Basic circuit of the hippocampus
