= Entorhinal cortex =

Area of the temporal lobe of the brain

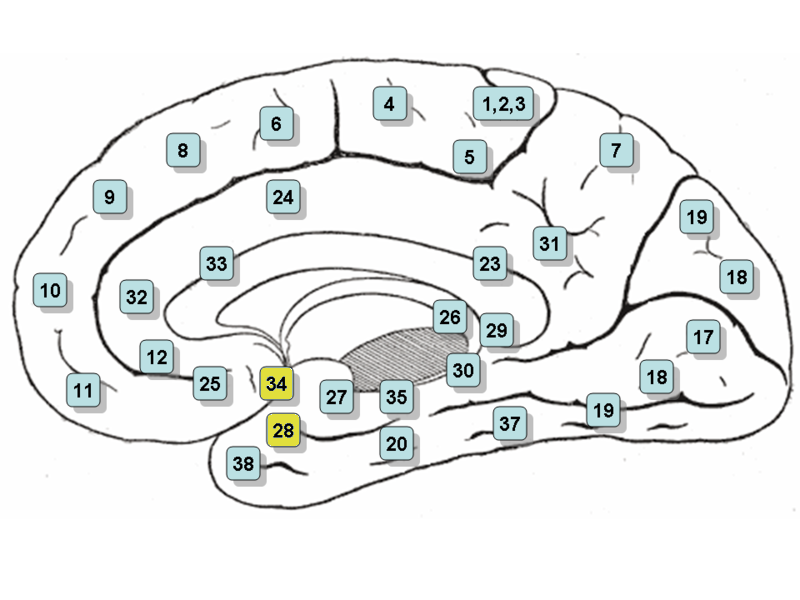
- Medial surface. (Entorhinal cortex approximately maps to areas 28 and 34, at lower left.)

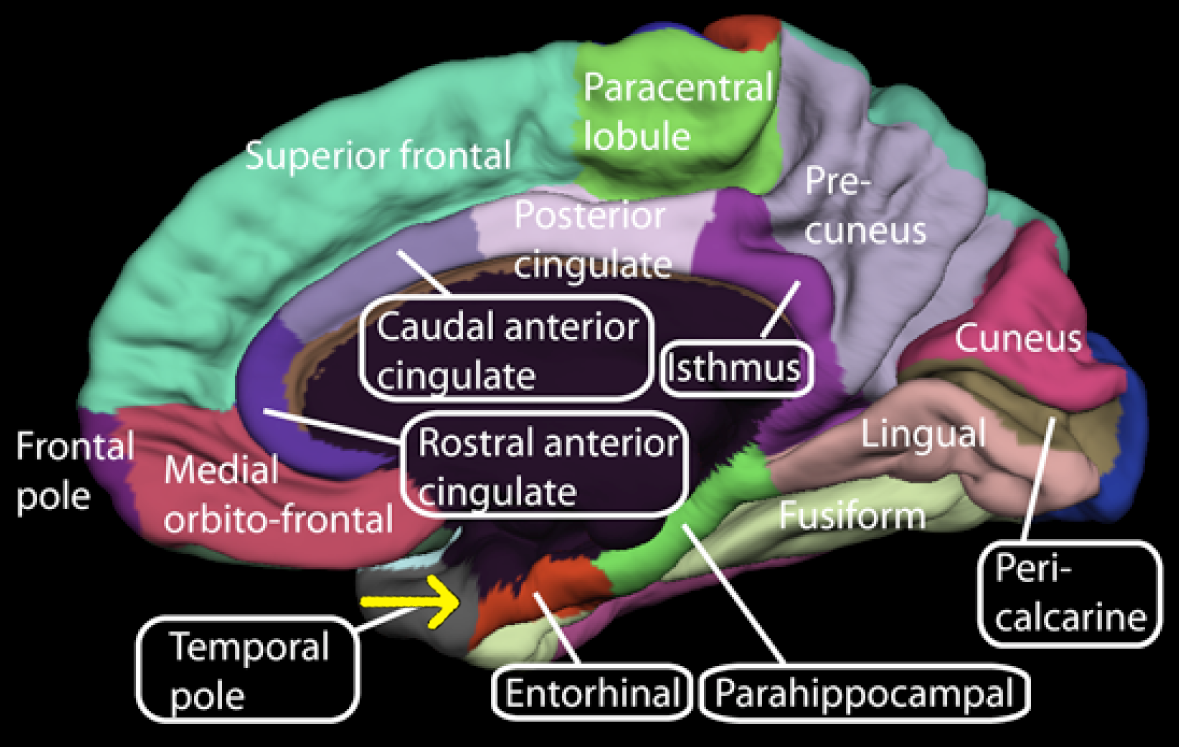
- Medial surface of right hemisphere. Entorhinal cortex visible at near bottom.

Details
- Part of: Temporal lobe
- Artery: Posterior cerebral Choroid
- Vein: Inferior striate

Identifiers
- Latin: cortex entorhinalis
- MeSH: D018728
- NeuroNames: 168
- NeuroLex ID: birnlex_1508

The entorhinal cortex (EC) is an area of the brain's allocortex, located in the medial temporal lobe, whose functions include being a widespread network hub for memory, navigation, and the perception of time. The EC is the main interface between the hippocampus and neocortex. The EC-hippocampus system plays an important role in declarative (autobiographical/episodic/semantic) memories and in particular spatial memories including memory formation, memory consolidation, and memory optimization in sleep. The EC is also responsible for the pre-processing (familiarity) of the input signals in the reflex nictitating membrane response of classical trace conditioning; the association of impulses from the eye and the ear occurs in the entorhinal cortex.

== Anatomy ==
The entorhinal cortex is a portion of the rostral parahippocampal gyrus.

=== Structure ===
It is usually divided into medial and lateral regions with three bands with distinct properties and connectivity running perpendicular across the whole area. A distinguishing characteristic of the EC is the lack of cell bodies where layer IV should be; this layer is called the Lamina dissecans.

=== Connections ===
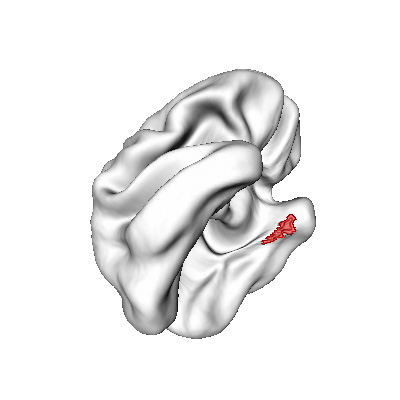
View of left entorhinal cortex (red) from beneath the brain, with front of brain at top. Artist's rendering.

The superficial layers – layers II and III – of EC project to the dentate gyrus and hippocampus: Layer II projects primarily to dentate gyrus and hippocampal region CA3; layer III projects primarily to hippocampal region CA1 and the subiculum. These layers receive input from other cortical areas, especially associational, perirhinal, and parahippocampal cortices, as well as prefrontal cortex. EC as a whole, therefore, receives highly processed input from every sensory modality, as well as input relating to ongoing cognitive processes, though it should be stressed that, within EC, this information remains at least partially segregated.

The deep layers, especially layer V, receive one of the three main outputs of the hippocampus and, in turn, reciprocate connections from other cortical areas that project to superficial EC.

=== Brodmann's areas ===
- Brodmann area 28 is known as the "area entorhinalis"
- Brodmann area 34 is known as the "area entorhinalis dorsalis"

== Function ==
=== Neuron information processing ===
In 2005, it was discovered that entorhinal cortex contains a neural map of the spatial environment in rats. In 2014, John O'Keefe, May-Britt Moser and Edvard Moser received the Nobel Prize in Physiology or Medicine, partly because of this discovery. Grid-cell-like signals were subsequently identified in the human entorhinal cortex: Doeller, Barry and Burgess (2010) used functional magnetic resonance imaging to detect a sixfold rotational symmetry in entorhinal BOLD signal as human participants navigated a virtual environment, consistent with a population of grid-like cells operating during human spatial behaviour.

In rodents, neurons in the lateral entorhinal cortex exhibit little spatial selectivity, whereas neurons of the medial entorhinal cortex (MEC), exhibit multiple "place fields" that are arranged in a hexagonal pattern, and are, therefore, called "grid cells". These fields and spacing between fields increase from the dorso-lateral MEA to the ventro-medial MEA.

The same group of researchers has found speed cells in the medial entorhinal cortex of rats. The speed of movement is translated from proprioceptive information and is represented as firing rates in these cells. The cells are known to fire in correlation to future speed of the rodent.

Recently, a general theory has been proposed to elucidate the function of the reelin positive cells in the layer II of the entorhinal cortex. According to this concept, these cells would be generally organized into 1-dimensional ring attractors, and in the medial (in humans: posteromedial) portion, would function as grid cells (anatomically: stellate cells) while in lateral (in humans: anterolateral) portion, where they appear as fan cells, would enable the encoding of new episodic memories. This concept is underscored by the fact that fan cells of the entorhinal cortex are indispensable for the formation of episodic-like memories in rodents.

Single-unit recording of neurons in humans playing video games find path cells in the EC, the activity of which indicates whether a person is taking a clockwise or counterclockwise path. Such EC "direction" path cells show this directional activity irrespective of the location of where a person experiences themselves, which contrasts them to place cells in the hippocampus, which are activated by specific locations.

EC neurons process general information such as directional activity in the environment, which contrasts to that of the hippocampal neurons, which usually encode information about specific places. This suggests that EC encodes general properties about current contexts that are then used by hippocampus to create unique representations from combinations of these properties.

Research generally highlights a useful distinction in which the medial entorhinal cortex (MEC) mainly supports processing of space, whereas the lateral entorhinal cortex (LEC) mainly supports the processing of time.

The MEC exhibits a strong ~8 Hz rhythmic neural activity known as theta. Alterations in the neural activity across the brain region results in an observed "traveling wave" phenomena across the MEC long-axis, similar to that of the hippocampus, due to asymmetric theta oscillations. The underlying cause of these phase shifts and their waveform changes is unknown.

Individual variation in the volume of EC is linked to taste perception. People with a larger EC in the left hemisphere found quinine, the source of bitterness in tonic water, less bitter.

== Clinical significance ==
=== Alzheimer's disease ===
The entorhinal cortex is the first area of the brain to be affected in Alzheimer's disease; in year 2013, a functional magnetic resonance imaging study has localised the area to the lateral entorhinal cortex. More recently, a particular group of neurons called fan cells have been proposed to be first neurons suffering Alzheimer's-related damage in the lateral entorhinal cortex.

Lopez et al. have shown, in a multimodal study, that there are differences in the volume of the left entorhinal cortex between progressing (to Alzheimer's disease) and stable mild cognitive impairment patients. These authors also found that the volume of the left entorhinal cortex inversely correlates with the level of alpha band phase synchronization between the right anterior cingulate and temporo-occipital regions.

In 2012, neuroscientists at UCLA conducted an experiment using a virtual taxi video game connected to seven epilepsy patients with electrodes already implanted in their brains, allowing the researchers to monitor neuronal activity whenever memories were being formed. As the researchers stimulated the nerve fibers of each of the patients' entorhinal cortex as they were learning, they were then able to better navigate themselves through various routes and recognize landmarks more quickly. This signified an improvement in the patients' spatial memory.

== Research ==
Effect of aerobic exercise

A study on young subjects found aerobic fitness to be positively correlated with entorhinal cortex volume, indicating that aerobic exercise may have a positive effect on the medial temporal lobe memory system (which includes the entorhinal cortex).

== In other animals ==
In rodents, the EC is located at the caudal end of the temporal lobe. The rodent entorhinal cortex shows a modular organization, with different properties and connections in different areas.

In primates it is located at the rostral end of the temporal lobe and stretches dorsolaterally.

== Additional images ==
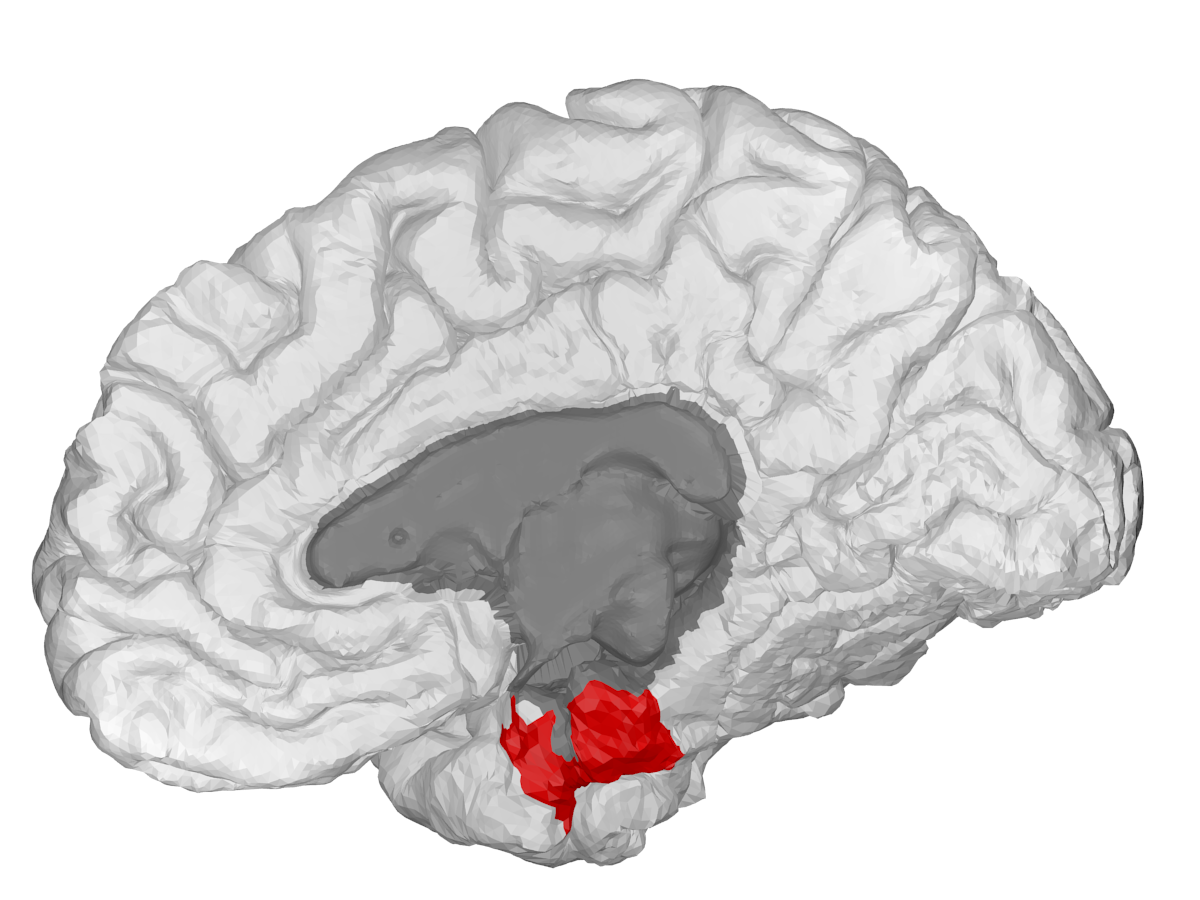
Entorhinal cortex, shown in the right cerebral hemisphere.
