= Periarchicortex =

Periarchicortex is one of two subtypes of periallocortex, the other being peripaleocortex. It is formed at borders between archicortex (a subtype of allocortex) and isocortex and shows slow histological transition from the four-layered structure typical for archicortex to the six-layered structure typical for isocortex.

Cortical areas that are generally considered to belong to periarchicortex, include presubiculum, parasubiculum, entorhinal cortex, perirhinal cortex, retrosplenial cortex, periarchicortical part of cingulate cortex, posterior part of subcallosal area, and subgenual area.

Periarchicortex does not contact immediately at borders with the true isocortex and does not transit directly into it. Instead, another transitional area from the isocortex side, called proisocortex, is formed at such borders. So, at borders between "true" archicortex and true isocortex, there are two transitional areas. One such area, which is anatomically located closer to the archicortex side and histologically more resembling it, is called periarchicortex. Another transitional area, which is anatomically located closer to the true isocortex and histologically more resembling it, is called proisocortex.
