= Neomammalian brain =

The neomammalian brain is one of three aspects of Paul MacLean's triune theory of the human brain. MacLean was an American physician and neuroscientist who formulated his model in the 1960s, which was published in his own 1990 book The Triune Brain in Evolution. MacLean's three-part theory explores how the human brain has evolved from ancestors over millions of years, consisting of the reptilian, paleomammalian and neomammalian complexes. MacLean proposes that the neomammalian complex is only found in higher order mammals, for example, the human brain, accounting for increased cognitive ability such as motor control, memory, improved reasoning and complex decision-making.

MacLean's theory explores how in higher order mammals, the neomammalian brain works interdependently with the reptilian and paleomammalian complexes to allow sophisticated thought processes to occur.

The theory of the neomammalian brain is based on MacLean's vast research conducted through comparing the structural differences between human brains and other organisms, including monkeys and a range of reptiles. MacLean's research was built upon previous neuroscience researchers' findings, including James Papez, which led to the formulation of the triune theory of the human brain and the limbic system, the two major contributions that MacLean made to the faculty of neuroscience.

== Paul MacLean ==
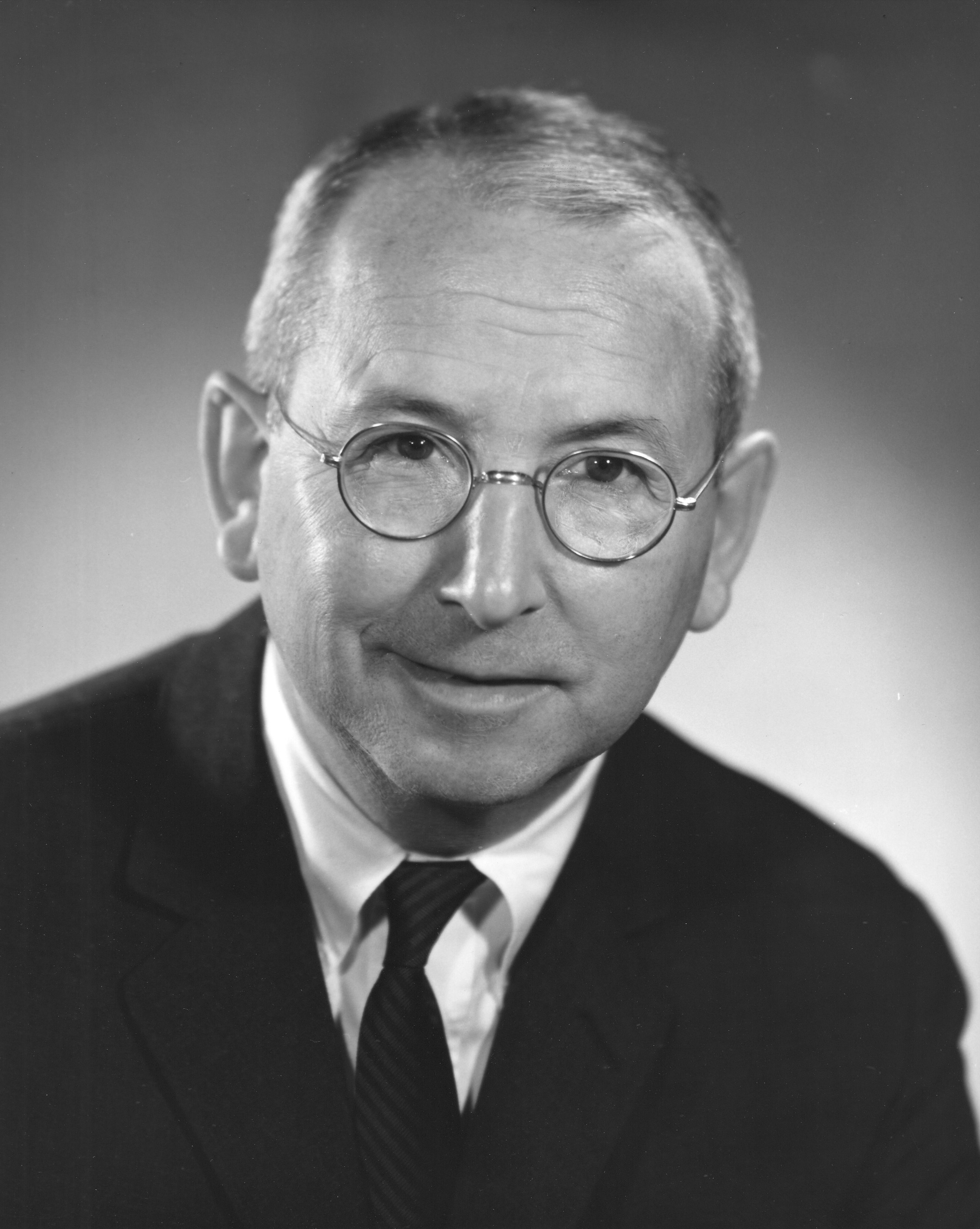
Paul Donald MacLean

Paul Donald MacLean was an American physician and neuroscientist who was born in Phelps, New York, on May 1, 1913, into a Presbyterian minister's family, thus, ultimately becoming a religious man himself. MacLean married Alison Stokes and lived in Mitchellville, Maryland, with their five children Alison, Alexander, David, James and Paul. MacLean died in Potomac, Maryland, in 2007, aged 94. MacLean is famous for his significant contributions to brain research, psychiatry and physiology. He spent a large amount of his working life at Yale Medical School and the National Institutes of Health, where through his research he was able to publish neuroscience texts, reports, photographs and audio-visual material on his neurological findings.

MacLean spent two years during World War 2 serving as a medical officer for the Yale Unit, which later became known as the 39th General Hospital. This experience helped to shape MacLean's perspective on the impacts of post-traumatic stress disorder on fallen soldiers, which would ultimately shape his future studies into the way the human brain functions and how it can be easily damaged through life experiences, with particular focus on sleeping disorders and other mental health issues, including anxiety and depression. MacLean had a deep fascination with the natural human instinct, and the role that the brain plays with rational human thinking. MacLean believed that there was a connection between a human's violent actions and rational behaviour.

In addition, MacLean coined the idea of the limbic system, the set of brain structures that surround the hypothalamus and are responsible for human emotions, memories and arousal. The research made by MacLean was based on previous studies by Dr James Papez, a neuroscientist who during the 1930s and 1940s delved into the circuit between the hippocampus, thalamus and cingulum, and how their connection is the basis for human emotion. MacLean proposed that the limbic system had developed over time in early mammals to control both fight and flight responses. MacLeans findings and proposals on the limbic system are both still questioned and debated by modern-day neuroscience researchers, failing to conclude whether MacLeans’ proposal is of accuracy.

== Structure ==
The Triune Brain is divided into three sections: Reptilian, Paleomammalian and Neomammalian. MacLean proposed that the human skull doesn't just contain one single brain, according to his Triune Brain Theory, it in fact holds three. These three separate brains work interdependently, interconnected by nerves, each of which operate differently with different capacities.

=== Reptilian ===
The Reptilian Brain was referred to by MacLean as the ‘R Complex’ or the primitive brain. This is the oldest brain in the Triune Theory and anatomically is made up of the brain stem and the cerebellum. In reptiles, both the brain stem and cerebellum dominate and are the control centres for basic function. It has been found that these two parts of the brain are responsible for emotions such as paranoia, obsession and compulsion. Further, being essential in regulating heart rate, body temperature and space orientation. For example, if a human holds their breath and carbon dioxide levels rise, the primitive brain initiates the lungs to start breathing to achieve a state of homeostasis.

=== Paleomammalian ===
The Paleomammalian brain is known as the intermediate or ‘old mammalian’ brain. The Paleomammalian brain anatomically consists of the hypothalamus, amygdala and the hippocampus. It is responsible for subconscious emotions such as fear, joy, fighting and sexual behaviour. The old mammalian brain is found in a large percentage of mammals and is believed to have a strong intricate connection with the neocortex. MacLeans idea of the ‘limbic system’ is based on the role the paleomammalian brain plays in brain function, where an individual's judgement of right and wrong stems from. MacLean had a particular influence on the role that the limbic system plays on mental health when it translates messages incorrectly, for example, how an individual can enter a state of deep distress when there is no stimuli to cause such a response, relating directly to MacLeans research into the causes of Post-Traumatic Stress Disorder.

=== Neomammalian ===
The neomammalian brain consists of the cerebral neocortex, which is found in higher mammals, especially in the human brain, and is not found in birds or reptiles. The neomammalian brains structure is of great complexity, and has evolved over time allowing humans to reach the top of the food chain.

The neocortex is made up of grey matter consisting of folds to increase the surface area and memory retention, these folds in humans are 80% excitatory and 20% inhibitory.

The arrangement of these folds differs from human to human, and is believed to account for the differing cognitive abilities of individual humans. It has been found by neuroscientists that the cerebral neocortex accounts for roughly 76% of the human brains total volume. The neocortex is predominately associated with high order brain functions such as motor control, sensory perception and cognition.

The neocortex can be divided into two sections; the proisocortex and the true isocortex. The Proisocortex is transitional between both the true isocotex and periallocortex, it can be found mainly in the cingulate gyrus, insula and the subcallosal areas of the brain. The true isocortex is a six layered cytoarchitecture that is predominately located in the frontal lobe, parietal lobe, temporal lobe and occipital lobe.

Another unique feature of the neocortex is the way in which the matter is arranged together in columns. In the human brain, the six neocortex layers are 2.5mm thick which contain thousands of different types of cells. Neuroscientists over the many years of research have struggled greatly to reach an agreed conclusion as to why the Neocortex is arranged in such a way; however, many suggest that the columns act as channels for intricate communication between cells and differing layers, this is believed to be another neurological explanation as to why higher order mammals have such a complex order of thinking in comparison to lower-order mammals, reptiles and birds.

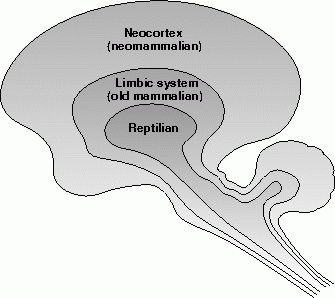

== Development ==
The neomammalian brain (neocortex) is the newest addition to the Human Brain. MacLean proposed that as animals evolved over the hundreds of millions of years, in order for an increased chance of survival, higher order animals developed an increased cognitive ability, which resulted in an increase in brain size.

MacLean firmly believed that the driving force in the development of the neocortex was the development of social behaviours, such as the separation cry between infant and mother during the development phase of offspring. It followed the idea that mammals evolved through learning about different methods of survival, as these mammals learnt various methods of survival through particular encounters, their brains developed into far more complex cytoarchitectures.

MacLeans model is based on the idea of the larger the brain size, the higher the order of thinking, thus, an increased cognitive ability. The neomammalian brain is in charge of all ‘rational thinking’, his model follows Charles Darwin's natural selection idea of ’survival of the fittest’, where those mammals that developed characteristics of the neomammalian brain survived and then passed this trait onto their offspring, until a stage was reached where the majority of the population of higher order mammals attained the survival trait, a process that occurred over millions and millions of years.

Archaeologists have discovered and are still discovering fossil records that allow comparative anatomy to occur between the modern-day Homo sapiens and primate ancestors. The tissue that the human brain is made up of decomposes once the organism has died, so old brain tissue cannot be analysed, however, due to the large percentage that the neomammalian brain takes up in the human brain, estimated to be 76%, comparative anatomy shows that the Homo sapiens has a much larger cranial size than early primate ancestors.

Many neuroscientists believe that MacLean's theory of the Triune Theory is false, however, what is a mutual agreement between the majority of neuroscientists, is that the features that McLean has described of the neomammalian brain is the reason as to why humans have such a high-level order of thinking.

== Clinical significance ==
Through comparing the three different sections of MacLean's Triune Theory, neuroscientists have been able to account for the complexity of the human brain in comparison to reptiles, birds and other lower order mammals. Animal scientists have dissected a vast array of organism's brains and through comparison ultimately concluded that the cerebral cortex (neomammalian Brain) has a different column structure to other organisms’. The discovery of the six layered neomammalian brain has allowed neuroscientists to research into their differing roles, and how each function interdependently to allow for complex thought to occur. The six layers have been separated into three different sections according to the role they play in the survival of a human.

Layers one to three are referred to as the supragranular layers and play a vital role in the origin and termination of intercortical connections.

Layer one is known as the molecular layer and is made up of very few nerve cells.

Layer two is the external granular layer that is made up small, dense neurons.

Layer three is the pyramidal layer and is made up larger pyramidal shaped neurons.

These three layers are composed of pyramidal cells, cells that have a pyramidal shaped axon with long dendrites connecting to other cells in neighbouring columns.

The second section of the neomammalian brain is the Internal Granular Layer, and is known as layer four by neuroscientists; this layer is responsible for receiving afferent signals from the hypothalamus and sends messages to the other layers. For example, layer four would receive messages about external temperature changes. The Internal Granular Layer acts as a medium which receives, processes and the sends signals to other parts of the brain, allowing the body to respond in such a way to combat the change in environment.

The final section is composed of layers five and six and is known as the infragranular layers; it connects the cerebral cortex with the subcortical regions of the brain, these regions are responsible for long-term memory, motor control and behavioural and emotional responses. Damages to layers five and six can be detrimental to the overall fitness of the mammal, usually resulting in some form of retardation or loss in cognitive processes.

These six layers of the neomammalian brain work interdependently to process neurological messages at an extremely fast and high-quality level. These six layers are only found in the modern day human brain; however, other higher order mammals have features of these layers that give allow them to have a high cognitive processing ability.
