= Xenisthmus oligoporus =

Conservation status
- Least Concern (IUCN 3.1)

Scientific classification
- Kingdom: Animalia
- Phylum: Chordata
- Class: Actinopterygii
- Division: Teleostei
- Order: Gobiiformes
- Family: Xenisthmidae
- Genus: Xenisthmus
- Species: X. oligoporus

Binomial name
- Xenisthmus oligoporus A. C. Gill, Bogorodsky & Mal, 2017

Species of fish

Xenisthmus oligoporus, the few-pored wriggler, is a species of marine ray-finned fish belonging to the family Xenisthmidae, the collared wrigglers. This species is endemic to the Red Sea.

== Taxonomy ==
Xenisthmus oligoporus was first formally described in 2017 by the ichthyologists Anthony C. Gill, Sergey V Bogorodsky and Ahmad O. Mal with its type locality given as the Red Sea off Saudi Arabia, Duba, an unnamed island fringing reef, at 27°04'N, 35°46'E, from a depth of 10–12 m (33–39 ft). This species is classified in the genus Xenisthmus which was described in 1908 by John Otterbein Snyder with Xenisthmus proriger designated as its type species, as well as being its type species by monotypy. Xenisthmus has been placed in the family Eleotridae, the sleeper gobies. but is now classified in the family Xenisthmidae, the collared wrigglers. Xenisthmidae is classified within the suborder Gobioidei, the gobies, of the order Gobiiformes, which also includes the cardinalfishes and sand divers.

== Etymology ==
Xenisthmus oligoporus is classified in the genus Xenisthmus, a name which puts the prefix xenos, meaning "strange" or "foreign", in front of isthmus, thought to be because the type species has gill emembranes that have edges that are no attached to the isthmus. The specific name, oligoporus, combines oligos, meaning "few" or "scanty", with porus, which mean "pores", referring to the lesser number of sensory pores on the head of this species in comparison to other species in the genus.

== Description ==
Xenisthmus oligoporus has an elongated body with an oval cross section and it reaches a maximum standard length of 2.3 cm (0.91 in).

== Distribution and habitat ==
Xenisthmus oligoporus is endemic to the Red Sea where it is know from 3 widely spaced localities Duba Island and the Farasan Islands in Saudi Araba and Towartit Reef in Sudan, it is probable that its actual distribution is somewhat wider then is currently known. It has been found at depths between 6 and 13 m (20 and 43 ft) in small caves in the walls of coral reefs and nearby sand flats.
