= Xenisthmus eirospilus =

Conservation status
- Least Concern (IUCN 3.1)

Scientific classification
- Kingdom: Animalia
- Phylum: Chordata
- Class: Actinopterygii
- Division: Teleostei
- Order: Gobiiformes
- Family: Xenisthmidae
- Genus: Xenisthmus
- Species: X. eirospilus

Binomial name
- Xenisthmus eirospilus A. C. Gill & Hoese, 2004

Species of fish

Xenisthmus eirospilus, the spotted wriggler, is a species of marine ray-finned fish belonging to the family Xenisthmidae, the collared wrigglers. This species is found in the Western Pacific Ocean.

== Taxonomy ==
Xenisthmus eirospilus was first formally described in 2004 by the American ichthyologists Anthony C. Gill and Douglass F. Hoese with its type locality given as the eastern slope of Elizabeth Reef at 29°54'S, 159°02'48"E in the Tasman Sea, Australia from a depth of 5–10 m (16–33 ft). This species is classified in the genus Xenisthmus which was described in 1908 by John Otterbein Snyder with Xenisthmus proriger designated as its type species, as well as being its type species by monotypy. Xenisthmus has been placed in the family Eleotridae, the sleeper gobies. but is now classified in the family Xenisthmidae, the collared wrigglers. Xenisthmidae is classified within the suborder Gobioidei, the gobies, of the order Gobiiformes, which also includes the cardinalfishes and sand divers.

== Etymology ==
Xenisthmus eirospilus is classified in the genus Xenisthmus, a name which puts the prefix xenos, meaning "strange" or "foreign", in front of isthmus, thought to be because the type species has gill emembranes that have edges that are no attached to the isthmus. The specific name, eirospilus, combines eiro, which means "to string together", with spilos, meaning "spots", a reference to the row of spots along the upper body of this fish.

== Description ==
Xenisthmus eirospilus body and it reaches a maximum standard length of 1.8 m (5 ft 11 in) in males and 2.1 m (6 ft 11 in) in females. This species has 6 spines it the first dorsal fin, 1 spine and 12 or 13 soft rays in its second dorsal fin while the anal fin has 1 spine ans 11 or 12 soft rays. The background colour is pale with 12 large spots arranged in a row along the upper body. There is a wide stripe running from the snout to the upper part of the base of the pectoral fin and a dark spot on the caudal peduncle which has area of reddish-orange colour above and below it.

== Distribution and habitat ==
Xenisthmus eirospilus is found in the western Pacific from Ashmore Reef in the Timor Sea and West Papua, Indonesia, east to American Samoa. Its habitat is sand patches among reefs and rubble, as well as in shallow surge areas.
