= Xenisthmus semicinctus =

Conservation status
- Data Deficient (IUCN 3.1)

Scientific classification
- Kingdom: Animalia
- Phylum: Chordata
- Class: Actinopterygii
- Division: Teleostei
- Order: Gobiiformes
- Family: Xenisthmidae
- Genus: Xenisthmus
- Species: X. semicinctus

Binomial name
- Xenisthmus semicinctus A. C. Gill & Hoese, 2004

Species of fish

Xenisthmus semicinctus, the halfbelt wriggler, is a species of marine ray-finned fish belonging to the family Xenisthmidae, the collared wrigglers. This species is found in the eastern Indian Ocean in the Timor Sea.

== Taxonomy ==
Xenisthmus semicinctus was first formally described in 2004 by the American ichthyologists Anthony C. Gill and Douglass F. Hoese with its type locality given as the Clerke Reef lagoon, 1.5 km (0.93 mi) south of Bedwell Island, at 17°18'S, 119°22'E, Rowley Shoals, Timor Sea. This species is classified in the genus Xenisthmus which was described in 1908 by John Otterbein Snyder with Xenisthmus proriger designated as its type species, as well as being its type species by monotypy. Xenisthmus has been placed in the family Eleotridae, the sleeper gobies. but is now classified in the family Xenisthmidae, the collared wrigglers. Xenisthmidae is classified within the suborder Gobioidei, the gobies, of the order Gobiiformes, which also includes the cardinalfishes and sand divers.

== Etymology ==
Xenisthmus semicinctus is classified in the genus Xenisthmus, a name which puts the prefix xenos, meaning "strange" or "foreign", in front of isthmus, thought to be because the type species has gill emembranes that have edges that are no attached to the isthmus. The specific name, semicinctus, means "half belted" or "half girdled", an allusion to the dark blotches on the upper part of the body.

== Description ==
Xenisthmus semicinctus a total of 7 spines and 12 soft rays in its dorsal fins and 1 spine and 11 soft rays in the anal fin. There are 12 large, dark close-set spots on the upper flanks, each joined to, or nearly to, the mid-line by a short, dusky-brown bar. This species has an elongated bodyand it reaches a maximum standard length of 1.9 cm (0.75 in).

== Distribution and habitat ==
Xenisthmus semicinctus is endemic to Western Australia where it is known only from the Clerke Reef in the Rowley Shoals in the Timor Sea. There are reports from other locations in Japan and Indonesia but these require confirmation. It is found in lagoons and coral reefs in shallow water.
