= Xenisthmus chi =

Conservation status
- Data Deficient (IUCN 3.1)

Scientific classification
- Kingdom: Animalia
- Phylum: Chordata
- Class: Actinopterygii
- Division: Teleostei
- Order: Gobiiformes
- Family: Xenisthmidae
- Genus: Xenisthmus
- Species: X. chi

Binomial name
- Xenisthmus chi A. C. Gill & Hoese, 2004

Species of fish

Xenisthmus chi, the chi wriggler, is a species of marine ray-finned fish belonging to the family Xenisthmidae, the collared wrigglers. This species is endemic to Western Australia.

== Taxonomy ==
Xenisthmus chi was first formally described in 2004 by the American ichthyologists Anthony C. Gill and Douglass F. Hoese with its type locality given as Clerke Reef, 2 km (1.2 mi) south of Bedwell Island, at 17°18'S, 119°20'E, Rowley Shoals in the Timor Sea. This species is classified in the genus Xenisthmus which was described in 1908 by John Otterbein Snyder with Xenisthmus proriger designated as its type species, as well as being its type species by monotypy. Xenisthmus has been placed in the family Eleotridae, the sleeper gobies. but is now classified in the family Xenisthmidae, the collared wrigglers. Xenisthmidae is classified within the suborder Gobioidei, the gobies, of the order Gobiiformes, which also includes the cardinalfishes and sand divers.

== Etymology ==
Xenisthmus chi is classified in the genus Xenisthmus, a name which puts the prefix xenos, meaning "strange" or "foreign", in front of isthmus, thought to be because the type species has gill emembranes that have edges that are no attached to the isthmus. The specific name, chi (χ), is the 22nd letter of the Greek alphabet and is an allusion to the X-shaped markings on the body of this fish.

== Description ==
Xenisthmus chi has an elongated body and it reaches a maximum standard length of 2.1 m (6 ft 11 in) in males and 2.2 m (7 ft 3 in) in females. This species has a total of 7 spines and 12 soft rays in its dorsal fins while the anal fin has 1 spine and 11 soft rays. The overall colour is pale with brown mottling which forms 11 x-shaped markings along the flanks, between the pectoral fin and the caudal peduncle.

== Distribution ==
Xenisthmus chi is endemic to Australia where it is known only from Clerke Reef at Rowley Shoals in the Timor Sea.
