= Xenisthmus chapmani =

Conservation status
- Data Deficient (IUCN 3.1)

Scientific classification
- Kingdom: Animalia
- Phylum: Chordata
- Class: Actinopterygii
- Division: Teleostei
- Order: Gobiiformes
- Family: Xenisthmidae
- Genus: Xenisthmus
- Species: X. chapmani

Binomial name
- Xenisthmus chapmani (Schultz, 1966)

Synonyms
- Kraemericus chapmani Schultz, 1966

Species of fish

Xenisthmus chapmani is a species of marine ray-finned fish belonging to the family Xenisthmidae, the collared wrigglers. This species is found in Vanuatu.

== Taxonomy ==
Xenisthmus chapmani was first formally described as Kraemericus chapmani in 1966 by the American ichthyologist Leonard Peter Schultz with its type locality given as the Espirutu Santo harbour, Vanuatu. This species is classified in the genus Xenisthmus which was described in 1908 by John Otterbein Snyder with Xenisthmus proriger designated as its type species, as well as being its type species by monotypy. Xenisthmus has been placed in the family Eleotridae, the sleeper gobies. but is now classified in the family Xenisthmidae, the collared wrigglers. Xenisthmidae is classified within the suborder Gobioidei, the gobies, of the order Gobiiformes, which also includes the cardinalfishes and sand divers.

== Etymology ==
Xenisthmus chapmani is classified in the genus Xenisthmus, a name which puts the prefix xenos, meaning "strange" or "foreign", in front of isthmus, thought to be because the type species has gill emembranes that have edges that are no attached to the isthmus. The specific name, chapmani, honours Wilbert McLeod Chapman, the Amertican ichthyologist who collected holotype.

== Description ==
Xenisthmus chapmani has an elongated body shape and it reaches a standard length of 1.6 cm (0.63 in). There are a total of 5 spines and 15 soft rays in the dorsal fins while the anal fin has 1 spine and 13 soft rays.

== Distribution and habitat ==
Xenisthmus chapmani has a highly restricted distribution, it is known only from Espiritu Santo Harbor, Vanuatu, in the Western Central Pacific). It is found sand patches in adjacent to coral reefs and rubble. It occurs from shallow tidal pools to depths of at least 30 m (98 ft).
