= Xenisthmus africanus =

Conservation status
- Least Concern (IUCN 3.1)

Scientific classification
- Kingdom: Animalia
- Phylum: Chordata
- Class: Actinopterygii
- Division: Teleostei
- Order: Gobiiformes
- Family: Xenisthmidae
- Genus: Xenisthmus
- Species: X. africanus

Binomial name
- Xenisthmus africanus J. L. B. Smith, 1958

Species of fish

Xenisthmus africanus, the flathead wriggler or African wriggler, is a species of marine ray-finned fish belonging to the family Xenisthmidae, the collared wrigglers. This species is found in the Indo-West Pacific region.

== Taxonomy ==
Xenisthmus africanus was first formally described in 1958 by the South African ichthyologist James Leonard Brierley Smith with its type locality given as Pinda, Mozambique. This species is classified in the genus Xenisthmus which was described in 1908 by John Otterbein Snyder with Xenisthmus proriger designated as its type species, as well as being its type species by monotypy. Xenisthmus has been placed in the family Eleotridae, the sleeper gobies. but is now classified in the family Xenisthmidae, the collared wrigglers. Xenisthmidae is classified within the suborder Gobioidei, the gobies, of the order Gobiiformes, which also includes the cardinalfishes and sand divers.

== Etymology ==
Xenisthmus africanus is classified in the genus Xenisthmus, a name which puts the prefix xenos, meaning "strange" or "foreign", in front of isthmus, thought to be because the type species has gill emembranes that have edges that are no attached to the isthmus. The specific name, africanus, means "of Africa", and refers to its type locality in Africa.

== Description ==
Xenisthmus africanus has an elongated body shape and it reaches a maximum total length of 3.8 cm (1.5 in). The first dorsal fin has 6 spines, the second has 1 spine and between 11 and 15 soft rays while the anal fin has 1 spine and between 10 and 14 soft rays. It has a flatter head than most other wrigglers. The flathead wriggler has a pale head with a thin dark stripe running from the lower lip to bases of the pectoral fins, widening on the body sometimes covering most of the body, reaching the lower lobe of the caudal fin. There are between 6 and 8 dark vertical bars between the lateral stripe to the base of the second dorsal fin.

== Distribution and habitat ==
Xenisthmus africanus is found in the Indian Ocean and Western Pacific Ocean from the eastern coast of Africa between Kenya and Mozambique, the Comoro Islands, Mascarene Islands, Seychelles, Chagos Archipelago as far east as the Autralian territory of the Cocos (Keeling) Islands with records from Phuket in Thailand, the Cuyo Archipelago in the Philippines, the Banda Islands in Indonesia and the Ninigo Islands in Papua New Guinea. Reports from elsewhere need to be confirmed. The flathead wriggler is found at depths down to 11 m (36 ft) on sand and fine coral grit substrates, as well as among coral rubble in coastal shallows.
