= Paraxenisthmus cerberusi =

Conservation status
- Data Deficient (IUCN 3.1)

Scientific classification
- Kingdom: Animalia
- Phylum: Chordata
- Class: Actinopterygii
- Division: Teleostei
- Order: Gobiiformes
- Family: Xenisthmidae
- Genus: Paraxenisthmus
- Species: P. cerberusi

Binomial name
- Paraxenisthmus cerberusi Winterbottom & A. C. Gill, 2006

Species of fish

Paraxenisthmus cerberusi is a species of marine ray-finned fish belonging to the family Xenisthmidae, the collared wrigglers. This species is known only from Palau and Fiji but it may have a more widespread distribution in the Pacific Ocean.

== Taxonomy ==
Paraxenisthmus cerberusi was first formally described in 2006 by the ichthyologists Richard Winterbottom and Anthony C. Gill withits type locality given as the southwest corner of Augulpelu Reef, southeast of Koror Island, at 7°16'54.3'N, 134°31'38.7"E, Palau, from a depth of 15–26.5 m (49–87 ft). This species is classified in the genus Paraxenisthmus which was described in 1993 by Anthony C. Gill and Douglass F. Hoese with Paraxenisthmus springeri designated as its type species, as well as being its type species by monotypy. This genus has been placed in the family Eleotridae, the sleeper gobies. but is now classified in the family Xenisthmidae, the collared wrigglers. Xenisthmidae is classified within the suborder Gobioidei, the gobies, of the order Gobiiformes, which also includes the cardinalfishes and sand divers.

== Etymology ==
Paraxenisthmus cerberusi is classified in the genus Paraxenisthmus, this name puts the prefix para-, meaning "close to", in front of the genus name Xenisthmus, as this genus resembles the shape of that genus. The specific name refers to Cerberus, the three-headed dog which guards the entrance to Hades in Greek mythology, given to this species because of its relatively large number of teeth and in reference to the black juveniles and the red and black adults, the colours of which are associated with Hell in Christianity.

== Description ==
Paraxenisthmus cerberusi has an elongated body and it reaches a maximum standard length of 2.1 cm (0.83 in). This species can be told apart from the other species in the genus by having 15-16 pectoral fin-rays, as opposed to 18; the cephalic lateralis pore P is absent, present in the other species; the head, nape, ventral abdomen and dorsal midline of caudal peduncle are naked while they are scaled in the type species and there is a large black blotch on the caudal peduncle while the type species has none.

== Distribution and habitat ==
Paraxenisthmus cerberusi was described from types taken in Palau and there is a more recent record from Fiji. This small fish was found in a drop-off which had caves and ledges with shelves and slopes covered in silt and sand. The area had growths of hydroids, sea fans, a range of hard corals and some Halimeda.
