= Xenisthmus balius =

Conservation status
- Least Concern (IUCN 3.1)

Scientific classification
- Kingdom: Animalia
- Phylum: Chordata
- Class: Actinopterygii
- Division: Teleostei
- Order: Gobiiformes
- Family: Xenisthmidae
- Genus: Xenisthmus
- Species: X. balius

Binomial name
- Xenisthmus balius A. C. Gill & Randall, 1994

Species of fish

Xenisthmus balius, the dappled wriggler or freckled wriggler, is a species of marine ray-finned fish belonging to the family Xenisthmidae, the collared wrigglers. This species is found in the Persian Gulf and the Red Sea.

== Taxonomy ==
Xenisthmus balius was first formally described in 1994 by the American ichthyologists Anthony C. Gill and John Ernest Randall with its type locality given as the northeastern side of Jana Island, from the base of a dropoff, Saudi Arabia, Persian Gulf, at a depth of 15 m (49 ft). This species is classified in the genus Xenisthmus which was described in 1908 by John Otterbein Snyder with Xenisthmus proriger designated as its type species, as well as being its type species by monotypy. Xenisthmus has been placed in the family Eleotridae, the sleeper gobies. but is now classified in the family Xenisthmidae, the collared wrigglers. Xenisthmidae is classified within the suborder Gobioidei, the gobies, of the order Gobiiformes, which also includes the cardinalfishes and sand divers.

== Etymology ==
Xenisthmus balius is classified in the genus Xenisthmus, a name which puts the prefix xenos, meaning "strange" or "foreign", in front of isthmus, thought to be because the type species has gill emembranes that have edges that are no attached to the isthmus. The specific name, balius, is a Latinisation of balios, which means "dappled", an allusion to the irregular mottling on the head and body.

== Description ==
Xenisthmus balius has an elongated body with an oval cross-section and it reaches a maximum standard length of 2.6 cm (1.0 in) in males and 3.1 cm (1.2 in) in females. The first dorsal fin has 6 spines, the second has 1 spine and between 14 soft rays while the anal fin has 1 spine and 12 or 13 soft rays. The head and body are pale with dark mottling on the upper body forming a reticulate pattern and 1 or 2 small black spots near middle of the caudal peduncle.

== Distribution and habitat ==
Xenisthmus balius is a species which is found Western Indian Ocean in the Persian Gulf and the Red Sea. In the Persian Gulf it has only been recorded from Jana Island in Saudi Arabia, although it is thought likely to be widespread in the Gulf. In the Red Sea this species has been collected off Egypt, Saudi Arabia and Eritrea. The dappled wriggler occurs at depths between 1.5 and 17 m (4 ft 11 in and 55 ft 9 in) in areas of sand and rubble in the vicinity of reefs.
