= Peripaleocortex =

Peripaleocortex is one of two subtypes of periallocortex, the other being periarchicortex. Peripaleocortex is formed at borders between isocortex (neocortex) and paleocortex (a subtype of allocortex). It shows slow histological transition from the three-layered structure characteristic of paleocortex to the typical six-layered structure characteristic of isocortex. The main peripaleocortex area is anterior insular cortex.

Peripaleocortex does not histologically transit directly to the true isocortex. Instead, at borders between peripaleocortex and isocortex, there are other transitional areas from the isocortex side, called proisocortex. Thus, at borders between paleocortex and isocortex, there are two transitional areas. One transitional area, which is anatomically located closer to the paleocortex side and histologically, too, more resembling "true" paleocortex, is called peripaleocortex area. Another transitional area, which is anatomically located close to the true isocortex side and histologically more resembling it too, is called proisocortex area.
