= Periallocortex =

Type of cortex between the allocortex and neocortex

Details
- Part of: Allocortex

Identifiers
- Latin: Periallocortex
- NeuroNames: 2315

Periallocortex is one of three subtypes of allocortex, the other two subtypes being paleocortex and archicortex. The periallocortex is formed at transition areas where any of the other two subtypes of allocortex borders with the neocortex (which is also called isocortex).

Thus, the periallocortex is also subdivided to two subtypes. One subtype is called peripaleocortex, which is formed at borders between paleocortex and neocortex. Areas considered to belong to peripaleocortex are for example anterior insular cortex. Another subtype of periallocortex is called periarchicortex. It is formed at borders between archicortex and neocortex. Areas considered to belong to periarchicortex include entorhinal cortex, perirhinal cortex, presubiculum, parasubiculum, retrosplenial cortex, subcallosal area and subgenual area.

No one allocortex or even periallocortex area borders, contacts or transitions immediately to the so-called true isocortex. Instead, they border and slowly transition to another transitional area from the neocortex side, called proisocortex, which then slowly transitions to the true isocortex. Thus, at borders between isocortex and allocortex there are two transitional areas, one from allocortex side and histologically more resembling allocortex, so it is called periallocortex, and another from isocortex side, histologically more resembling true isocortex, so it is called proisocortex.

Those two transitional areas (one from isocortex or neocortex side, called proisocortex, and another from allocortex side, called periallocortex) together form what is called mesocortex.
