= Proisocortex =

One of two subtypes of cortical areas

Proisocortex or pro-isocortex is one of two subtypes of cortical areas in the areas belonging to the neocortex. The other subtype is termed the true isocortex. Proisocortical areas are transitional areas placed between areas of true isocortex and areas of periallocortex (which themselves are transitional between "true" allocortex and proisocortex). The histological structure of proisocortex is also transitional between true isocortex and either peripaleocortex or periarchicortex, depending on with which subtype of periallocortex the given proisocortical area borders.

Proisocortex is found in the cingulate cortex (part of the limbic system), in Brodmann's areas 24, 25, 30 and 32, the insula and parahippocampal gyrus.

The transitional cortical areas from isocortical side (i.e. proisocortex) and from allocortical side (i.e. periarchicortex and peripaleocortex) together are called mesocortex. The mesocortex is essentially the same as paralimbic cortex, as all mesocortical transitional areas are found exclusively in paralimbic region, and vice versa - all the paralimbic cortex is mesocortical in its nature (embryonic and phylogenetic origins) and in its histology. But the term "mesocortex" represents a different concept from the term "paralimbic cortex". The mesocortex is distinguished from other cortical areas based on cytoarchitectonics and histology, while the paralimbic cortex is an anatomical designation, meaning cortical areas near subcortical limbic structures.
