= Xenisthmus polyzonatus =

Conservation status
- Least Concern (IUCN 3.1)

Scientific classification
- Kingdom: Animalia
- Phylum: Chordata
- Class: Actinopterygii
- Division: Teleostei
- Order: Gobiiformes
- Family: Xenisthmidae
- Genus: Xenisthmus
- Species: X. polyzonatus

Binomial name
- Xenisthmus polyzonatus (Klunzinger, 1871)

Synonyms
- Eleotris polyzonatus Klunzinger, 1871; Luzoneleotris nasugbua Herre, 1938

Species of fish

Xenisthmus polyzonatus, bullseye wriggler or barred wriggler, is a species of marine ray-finned fish belonging to the family Xenisthmidae, the collared wrigglers. This species has a wide range in the Indian Ocean and the Pacific Ocean.

== Taxonomy ==
Xenisthmus polyzonatus was first formally described as Eleotris polyzonatus in 1871 by the German zoologist Carl Benjamin Klunzinger with its type locality given as the Red Sea at Al-Qusair, Red Sea Governorate, Egypt. This species is currently classified in the genus Xenisthmus which was described in 1908 by John Otterbein Snyder with Xenisthmus proriger designated as its type species, as well as being its type species by monotypy. Xenisthmus has been placed in the family Eleotridae, the sleeper gobies. but is now classified in the family Xenisthmidae, the collared wrigglers. Xenisthmidae is classified within the suborder Gobioidei, the gobies, of the order Gobiiformes, which also includes the cardinalfishes and sand divers.

== Etymology ==
Xenisthmus polyzonatus is classified in the genus Xenisthmus, a name which puts the prefix xenos, meaning "strange" or "foreign", in front of isthmus, thought to be because the type species has gill emembranes that have edges that are no attached to the isthmus. The specific name, polyzonatus, means "many banded", an allusion to the 12 or 13 black transverse bands on the body of this species.

== Description ==
Xenisthmus polyzonatus has an elongated body with an oval cross section and it reaches a maximum total length of 3.1 cm (1.2 in). This species has 6 spines in the first dorsal fin, 1 spine and 11 or 12 soft rays in the second dorsal fin while the anal fin has 1 spine and 16 to 18 soft rays, although having as few as 16 rays is rare. There are 13 wide dark bars on the upper half to two-thirds of the body, the first runs through the bases of the pectoral fins and the last is vlose to the end of the caudal peduncle. There is a dark bar under the eyes and a large black spot on the tail which has a margin of white then orange. The juveniles are less boldly marked than the adults.

== Distribution and habitat ==
Xenisthmus polyzonatus has a wide but scattered Indo-Pacific distribution. In the Indian Ocean it is know from the Red Sea, the Maldives and the Chagos Archipelago, while in the Pacific it has been recorded from Indonesia, Australia, the Philippines, the Marianas, the Ryukyu Islands, Papua New Guinea, New Caledonia, Fiji, Tonga and Samoa. It is found at depths between 9 and 24 m (30 and 79 ft) in inshore waters on the sandy edges of coral reefs and among coral rubble in lagoons and sheltered waters.
