= Gymnoxenisthmus tigrellus =

Conservation status
- Data Deficient (IUCN 3.1)

Scientific classification
- Kingdom: Animalia
- Phylum: Chordata
- Class: Actinopterygii
- Division: Teleostei
- Order: Gobiiformes
- Family: Xenisthmidae
- Genus: Gymnoxenisthmus
- Species: G. tigrellus

Binomial name
- Gymnoxenisthmus tigrellus A. C. Gill, Bogorodsky & A. O. Mal, 2014

Species of fish

Gymnoxenisthmus tigrellus, the tiger wriggler, is a species of marine ray-finned fish belonging to the family Xenisthmidae, the collared wrigglers. This species is endemic to the Red Sea.

== Taxonomy ==
Gymnoxenisthmus tigrellus was first formally described in 2014 by the ichthyologists Anthony C. Gill, Sergey Vasilievich Bogorodsky and Ahmad Osman Mal with its type locality given as Saudi Arabia, Farasan Archipelago at 16°47.451"N, 42°11.838"E, in the Red Sea from a depth of 8 m (26 ft). When they described this species they also described the new genus Gymnoxenisthmus, designating G. tigrellus as its type species, as well as it being its type species by monotypy, although a second species, G. flavicinctus was described by Gill, Bogorodsky and Mal in 2019. This genus has been placed in the family Eleotridae, the sleeper gobies. but is now classified in the family Xenisthmidae, the collared wrigglers. Xenisthmidae is classified within the suborder Gobioidei, the gobies, of the order Gobiiformes, which also includes the cardinalfishes and sand divers.

== Etymology ==
Gymnoxenisthmus tigrellus is the type species of the genus Gymnoxenisthmus a name which combines gymnos, meaning "naked", a reference to the lack of scales on the body, with the genus name Xenisthmus, as this genus resembles the shape of that genus. The specific name tigrellus, means "little tiger", an allusion to the orange bars on the body. The specific name was chosen by school children at the Australian Museum Science Festival Expo in August 2013.

== Description ==
Gymnoxenisthmus tigrellus has an elongated body with an oval crosssection and it reaches a standard length of 1.5 cm (0.59 in). The first dorsal fin contains 5 spines, the secon dorsal fin has a single spine and 13 soft rays while the anal fin has a single spine and 12 soft rays. The head is transluscent blue and there are 14 orange markings, stripes, blotches and spots, along the middle of the sides.

== Distribution and habitat ==
Gymnoxenisthmus tigrellus is known only from its holotype, a gravid female collected from sand at the base of corals at the Farasan Islands of Saudi Arabia in the southern Red Sea.
