= Area 30 =

Area 30 can refer to:

- Area 30 (Nevada National Security Site)
- Brodmann area 30
