= Rotuma (disambiguation) =

Rotuma may refer to:

- Rotuma Group - a group of volcanic islands that constitute a dependency of Fiji
  - Republic of Rotuma - a proposed state
  - Rotuma Island - the main island in that group
  - Rotuma (Rotuman Communal Constituency, Fiji) - an electoral division of Fiji, the sole communal constituency reserved for citizens of Rotuman descent
- Rotuma (fish) - a monotypic fish genus in the family Xenisthmidae
- Rotuma myzomela - a species of honeyeater endemic to Rotuma

== See also ==
- Rotuman (disambiguation)
