= Archicortex =

Phylogenetically oldest part of the cerebral cortex or pallium

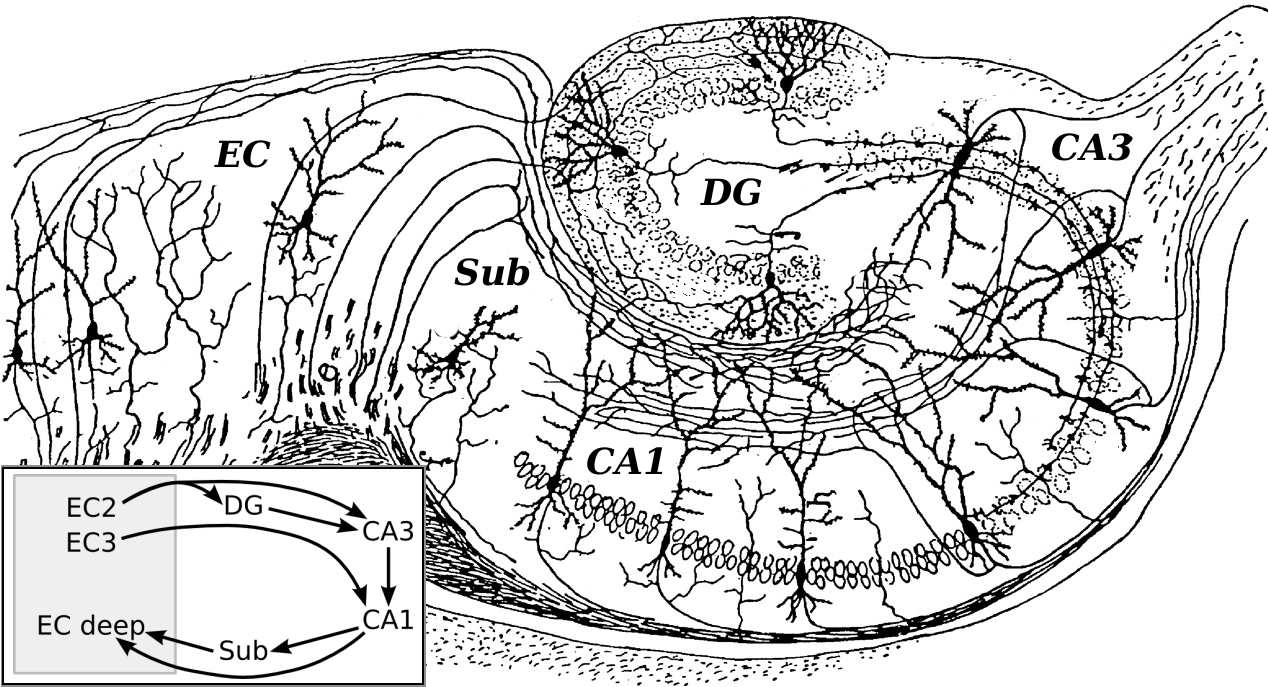
- The archicortex in humans is a synonym of the hippocampal formation. The hippocampal formation is shown here, as drawn by Santiago Ramon y Cajal: DG: dentate gyrus. Sub: subiculum. EC: entorhinal cortex. CA1-CA3: hippocampus proper

Details
- Part of: cerebral cortex or pallium
- System: Olfactory system

Identifiers
- Latin: archicortex
- NeuroNames: 170
- NeuroLex ID: birnlex_715
- TA98: A14.1.09.302
- TA2: 5530
- TE: E5.14.3.4.3.1.31 E5.14.3.4.3.1.32, E5.14.3.4.3.1.31
- FMA: 62424

The archicortex, or archipallium, is the phylogenetically second oldest region of the brain's cerebral cortex (the oldest is the paleocortex). In older species, such as fish, the archipallium makes up most of the cerebrum. Amphibians develop an archipallium and paleopallium.

In humans, the archicortex makes up the three cortical layers of the hippocampus. It has fewer cortical layers than both the neocortex, which has six, and the paleocortex, which has either four or five. The archicortex, along with the paleocortex and periallocortex, is a subtype of allocortex. Because the number of cortical layers that make up a type of cortical tissue seems to be directly proportional to both the information-processing capabilities of that tissue and its phylogenetic age, the archicortex is thought to be the oldest and most basic type of cortical tissue.

== Location ==
The archicortex is most prevalent in the olfactory cortex and the hippocampus, which are responsible for processing smells and forming memories, respectively. Because olfaction is considered to be the phylogenetically oldest sensory modality, and the limbic system, of which the hippocampus is a part, is one of the oldest systems in the brain, it is likely that the archicortex was one of the first types of tissue to develop in primitive nervous systems.

Archicortical precursor cells are also present in the dentate gyrus of the developing mammalian embryo.

== Structure ==
The archicortex is largely made up of memorizing cells with two types of afferent synapses: excitatory and unmodifiable inhibitory synapses. Memorizing cell inhibition serves two functions: one is controlling synaptic modification conditions in the memorizing cell dendrites during learning, and the other is controlling cell thresholds during recall. Unlike the neocortex, the archicortex lacks climbing fibers (fibers involved in the clustering part of neocortical classification). Consequently, the archicortex is not adapted for this type of classification.

== Memory ==
Unlike the neocortex, current theories of the archicortex argue that it performs simple memorization without changing the input's format in any complex manner. The archicortex is unable to classify inputs. It has two main uses: free simple memory and directed simple memory.

== See also ==
- Paralimbic cortex
- Regions in the human brain
