= Area 29 =

Area 29 can refer to:

- Area 29 (Nevada National Security Site)
- Brodmann area 29
