= Area 26 =

Area 26 can refer to:

- Area 26 (Nevada National Security Site)
- Brodmann area 26
