= Brodmann area 26 =

Small part of the brain

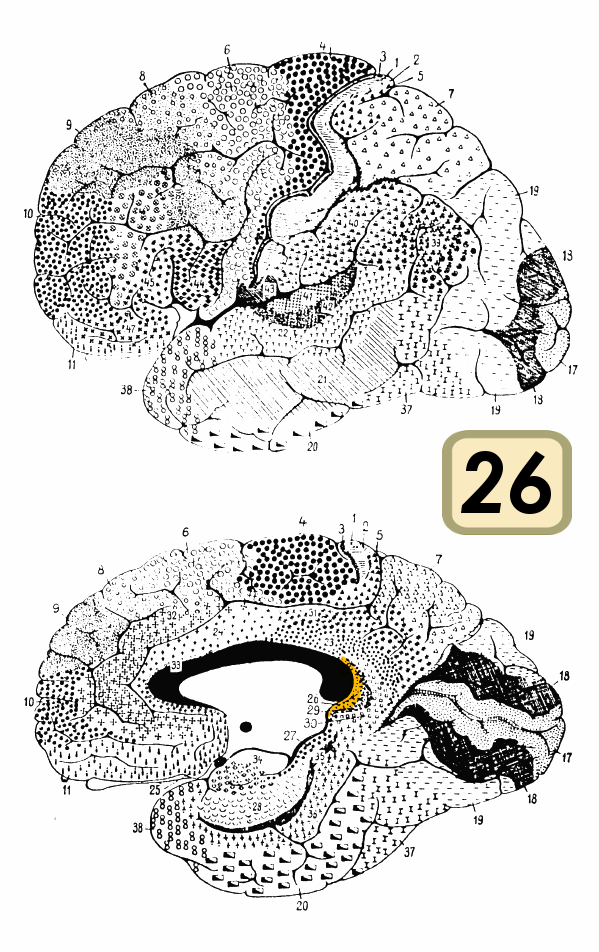

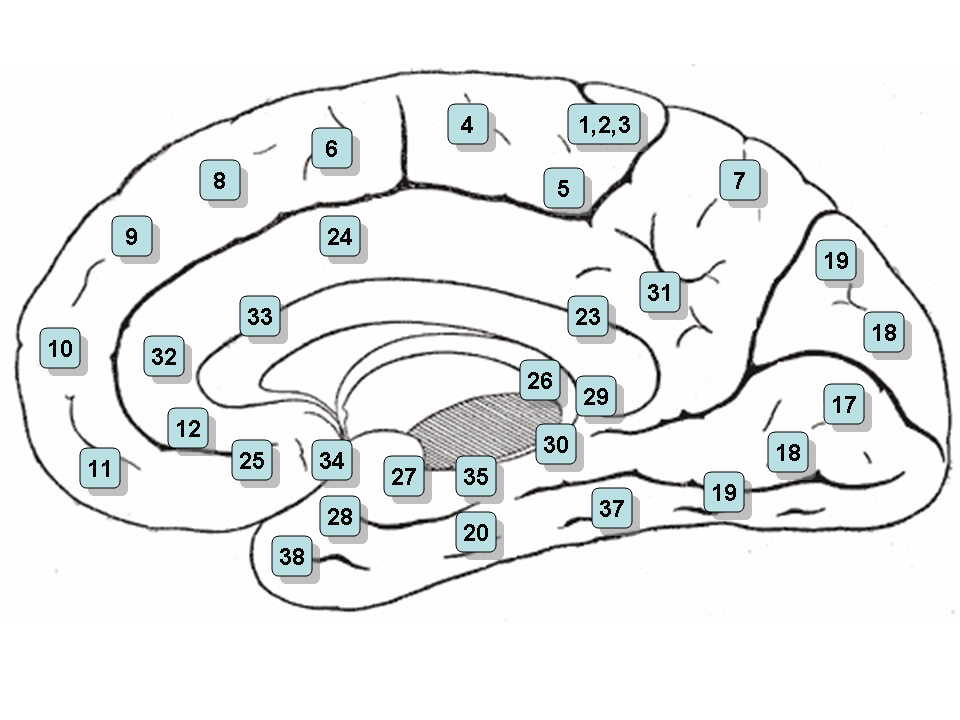
- Medial surface of the brain with Brodmann's areas numbered.

Details

Identifiers
- Latin: area ectosplenialis
- NeuroNames: 1031
- NeuroLex ID: birnlex_1757
- FMA: 68623

Brodmann area 26 is the name for a small part of the brain.

== Human ==
In the human, this area is called ectosplenial area 26. It is a cytoarchitecturally defined portion of the retrosplenial region of the cerebral cortex. It is a narrow band located in the isthmus of cingulate gyrus adjacent to the fasciolar gyrus internally. It is bounded externally by the granular retrolimbic area 29 (Brodmann-1909).

== Guenon ==
In the guenon, Brodmann area 26 is a subdivision of the cerebral cortex defined on the basis of cytoarchitecture. The smallest of Brodmann's cortical areas in the monkey, it represents cortex that is less differentiated and smaller in monkey and human than in other species. Brodmann regarded it as topographically and cytoarchitecturally homologous to the combined human ectosplenial area 26, granular retrolimbic area 29 and agranular retrolimbic area 30 (Brodmann-1909). Distinctive features (Brodmann-1905): thin cortex; distinct but narrow layers.

== See also ==
- Brodmann area
- List of regions in the human brain
