= Tyson (disambiguation) =

Tyson is both a surname and a masculine given name.

Tyson may also refer to:

== Films ==
- Tyson (1995 film), an HBO television movie about heavyweight boxer Mike Tyson
- Tyson (2008 film), a documentary about Mike Tyson
- Tyson (2016 film), an Indian Kannada-language film
- Tyson, a fictional villain played by Gulshan Grover in the 1994 Indian film Mohra

== Places ==
- Tysons Corner, Virginia, a census-designated place also known as Tysons
- Tyson Research Center, a biological field station in Missouri
- Tyson Wash, Arizona
- Tyson Event Center/ Gateway Arena, Sioux City, Iowa
- 13123 Tyson, an asteroid
- Tyson, Ontario, Canada

== Other uses ==
- Tyson Foods, multinational agribusiness corporation
- Tyson (dog), skateboarding bulldog
- Tyson (fish), a genus of perciform fishes
- Tyson turbine, a hydropower system
- Tyson Medal, an astronomy prize at the University of Cambridge
- T.Y.S.O.N., a poem published in 1898
