= Paraxenisthmus =

Scientific classification
- Kingdom: Animalia
- Phylum: Chordata
- Class: Actinopterygii
- Order: Gobiiformes
- Family: Eleotridae
- Genus: Paraxenisthmus; Gill & Hoese 1993

Type species
- Paraxenisthmus springeri Gill & Hoese 1993

Genus of fishes

Paraxenisthmus is a genus of goby from the western Pacific. They were classified as being in the family Xenisthmidae but this family is regarded as a synonym of the Eleotridae.

== Species ==
Two species are classified as members of the Paraxenisthmus

- Paraxenisthmus cerberusi Winterbottom & A. C. Gill, 2006
- Paraxenisthmus springeri Gill & Hoese 1993
