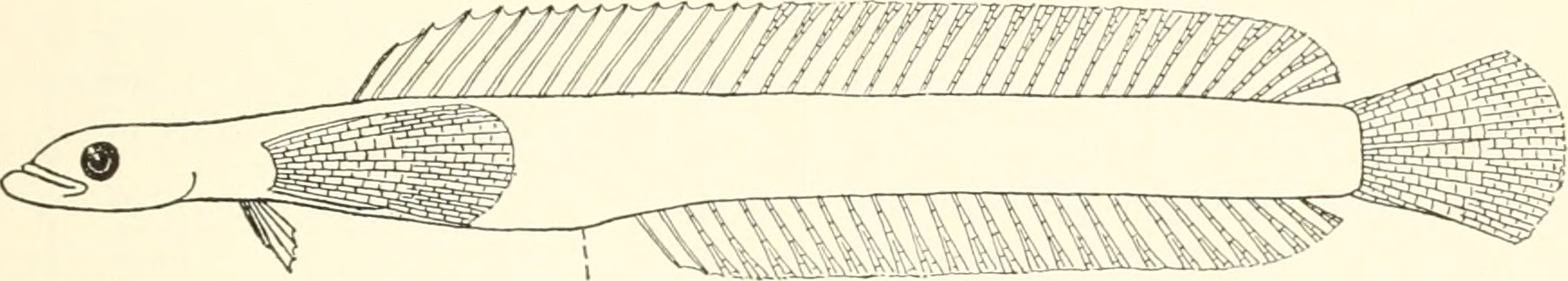

Conservation status
- Data Deficient (IUCN 3.1)

Scientific classification
- Kingdom: Animalia
- Phylum: Chordata
- Class: Actinopterygii
- Division: Teleostei
- Order: Gobiiformes
- Family: Xenisthmidae
- Genus: Allomicrodesmus; Schultz, 1966
- Species: A. dorotheae

Binomial name
- Allomicrodesmus dorotheae Schultz, 1966

= Dorothea's wriggler =

Species of fish

Dorothea's wriggler (Allomicrodesmus dorotheae) is a species of marine ray-finned fish belonging to the family Xenisthmidae, the collared wrigglers. This fish is found in the western Pacific Ocean where it is only known from the Marshall Islands and off northeastern Australia. It is the only species in the monospecific genus Allomicrodesmus.

== Taxonomy ==
Dorothea's wriggler was first formally described in 1966 by the American ichthyologist Leonard Peter Schultz with its type locality given as a reef at the entrance to the lagoon at Enyu Island in Bikini Atoll. At the same time as he described the new species Schultz also described the new genus Allomicrodesmus designating A. dorotheae as its type species, as well as being its type species by monotypy. This taxon has been placed in the family Eleotridae, the sleeper gobies. but is now classified in the family Xenisthmidae, the collared wrigglers. Xenisthmidae is classified within the suborder Gobioidei, the gobies, of the order Gobiiformes, which also includes the cardinalfishes and sand divers.

== Etymology ==
Dorothea's wriggler is the only species in the genus Allomicrodesmus, a name which puts the prefix allo-, meaning "other", into the genus name Microdesmus, to which that taxa was thought to be closely related. The specific name honours Dorothea Bowers Schultz, Schultz's wife, who illustrated the monograph in which this species is described, although not this species.

== Description ==
Dorothea's wriggler has an elongate body and it reaches a standard length of 21 mm (0.83 in). It has 2 spines and between 32 and 36 soft rays in its dorsal fin and 25 or 26 soft rays in its anal fin.

== Distribution and habitat ==
Dorothea's wriggler is found in the Western Pacific where it is only known from three localities, two off northeastern Australia, Osprey Reef in the Coral Sea and Yonge Reed off Queensland, and the thirs is Bikini Atoll in the Marshall Islands. This species is found in snady patches on coral reefs.
