= Gymnoxenisthmus =

Scientific classification
- Kingdom: Animalia
- Phylum: Chordata
- Class: Actinopterygii
- Division: Teleostei
- Order: Gobiiformes
- Family: Xenisthmidae
- Genus: Gymnoxenisthmus; A. C. Gill, Bogorodsky & Mal, 2014

Type species
- Gymnoxenisthmus tigrellus A. C. Gill, Bogorodsky & Mal, 2014

Genus of fish

Gymnoxenisthmus is a genus of marine ray-finned fishes belonging to the family Xenisthmidae, the collared wrigglers. The fishes in this genus are found in the Red Sea.

== Species ==
Gymnoxenisthmus contains the following valid species:

- Gymnoxenisthmus flavicinctus A. C. Gill, Bogorodsky & Mal, 2019
- Gymnoxenisthmus tigrellus A. C. Gill, Bogorodsky & Mal, 2014
