= Rotuman =

Rotuman may refer to:

- anything related to the island of Rotuma, Fiji
- Rotuman people, from the island of Rotuma
- Rotuman language, their Austronesian language

== See also ==
- Rotuma (disambiguation)
