= Paraxenisthmus springeri =

Conservation status
- Data Deficient (IUCN 3.1)

Scientific classification
- Kingdom: Animalia
- Phylum: Chordata
- Class: Actinopterygii
- Order: Gobiiformes
- Family: Eleotridae
- Genus: Paraxenisthmus
- Species: P. springeri

Binomial name
- Paraxenisthmus springeri Gill & Hoese, 1993

Species of fish

Paraxenisthmus springeri is a species of fish in the genus Paraxenisthmus of the Xenisthmidae (wriggler) family, which is regarded as a synonymous with the Eleotridae, from the West Pacific. Its specific name honours the American ichthyologist Victor G. Springer (b. 1928) of the U.S. National Museum for his contributions to fish systematics.
