= Brodmann area 29 =

Brain area in the retrosplenial cortex

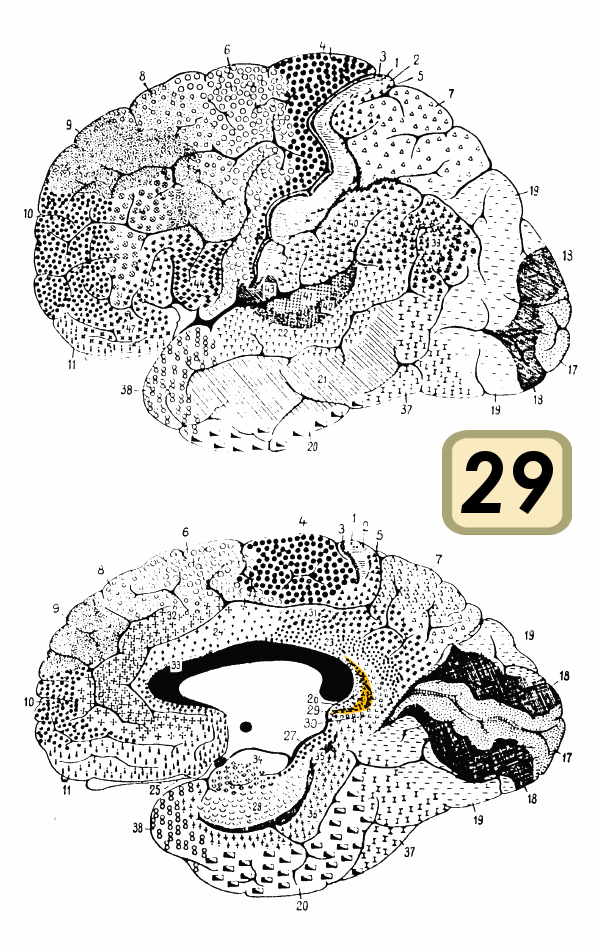

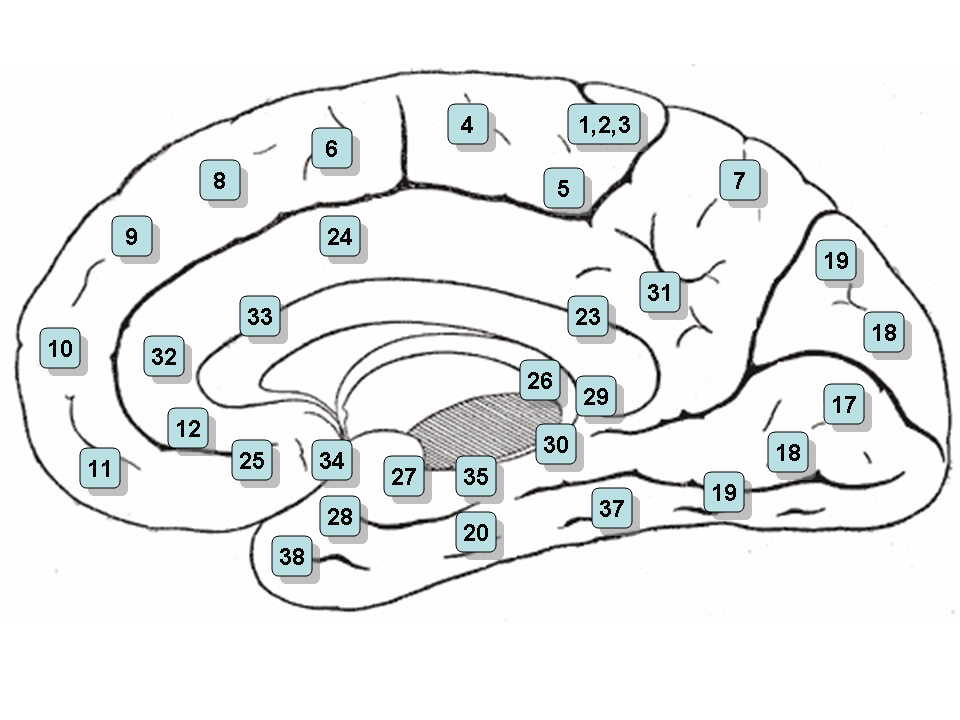
- Medial surface of the brain with Brodmann's areas numbered.

Details

Identifiers
- Latin: area retrosplenialis granularis
- NeuroLex ID: birnlex_1763
- FMA: 68626

Brodmann area 29, also known as granular retrolimbic area 29 or granular retrosplenial cortex, is a cytoarchitecturally defined portion of the retrosplenial region of the cerebral cortex. In the human it is a narrow band located in the isthmus of cingulate gyrus. Cytoarchitecturally it is bounded internally by the ectosplenial area 26 and externally by the agranular retrolimbic area 30 (Brodmann-1909).

Brodmann has this to say about area 29, amongst his other comments on it:

"An unusual regression of layer II together with layer III is found in the granular retrosplenial cortex, illustrated in Figures 38 to 41 for four different animals. Here, in addition to the regression of layers II and III, there is fusion of the original layers V and VI and at the same time an isolated massive increase of the inner granular layer, that is particularly prominent in Figures 38 and 39;..."

== See also ==
- Brodmann area
- Retrosplenial region
