= Kronig isthmus =

Kronig isthmus is a band of resonance representing the apex of lung, also it's described as the narrow strap-like portion of the resonant field that extends over the shoulder, that connect the larger areas of resonance over the pulmonary apex in front and behind.

== Boundaries ==
- Medially: Scalene
- Laterally: Acromion process
- Anteriorly: Clavicle
- Posteriorly: Trapezius
