= Arrow wriggler =

Conservation status
- Least Concern (IUCN 3.1)

Scientific classification
- Kingdom: Animalia
- Phylum: Chordata
- Class: Actinopterygii
- Division: Teleostei
- Order: Gobiiformes
- Family: Xenisthmidae
- Genus: Tyson; Springer, 1983
- Species: T. belos

Binomial name
- Tyson belos Springer, 1983

Species of fish

The arrow wriggler (Tyson belos), also known as Tyson's wriggler or Tyson's arrow goby, is a species of marine ray-finned fish belonging to the family Xenisthmidae, the collared wrigglers. It is the only species in the monospecific genus Tyson. The arrow wriggler is found in the western Pacific Ocean.

== Taxonomy ==
The arrow wriggler was first formally described in 1983 by the American ichthyologist Victor G. Springer with its type locality given as the outer barrier of Escape Reef, Queensland, Australia from a depth of 29 m (95 ft). At the same time as he described the new species Springer also described the new genus Tyson designating T. belos as its type species, as well as being its type species by monotypy. This taxon has been placed in the family Eleotridae, the sleeper gobies. but is now classified in the family Xenisthmidae, the collared wrigglers. Xenisthmidae is classified within the suborder Gobioidei, the gobies, of the order Gobiiformes, which also includes the cardinalfishes and sand divers.

== Etymology ==
The arrow wriggler is the only species in the genus Tyson, this genus is named for American ichthyologist Tyson R. Roberts, who first collected this species and recognised that it was a distinct taxon. The specific name, belos, is Greek for "arrow", an allusion to the arrow-like shape of this species.

== Description ==
The arrrow wriggler is a small species with a maximum total length of 2.2 cm (0.87 in) and an elongated body. Both the dorsal and anal fins have 1 spine and 9 or 10 soft rays. The life colour of this species is not known but preserved specimens are whitish eiayj an indistonct black spot on the caudal peduncle. This species has no scales, gill rakers or sensory pores.

== Distribution ==
The arrow wriggler has been recorded from scattered localities in the West Pacific Ocean including Flores in Indonesia, the Trobriand Islands, the Great Barrier Reef, the Solomon Islands, Vanuatu and Fiji. It is found at depths ranging from is 10 to 30 metres (33 to 98 ft)in sandy areas on coral reefs
