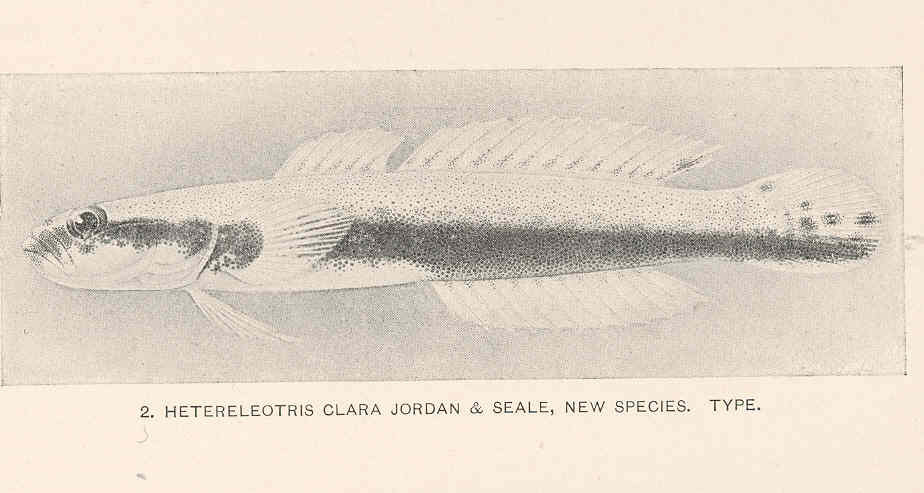
- Xenisthmus clarus

Scientific classification
- Kingdom: Animalia
- Phylum: Chordata
- Class: Actinopterygii
- Division: Teleostei
- Order: Gobiiformes
- Family: Xenisthmidae
- Genus: Xenisthmus; Snyder, 1908

Type species
- Xenisthmus proriger Snyder, 1908<

Synonyms
- Gignimentum Whitley, 1933; Luzoneleotris Herre, 1938; Platycephalops J. L. B. Smith, 1957; Kraemericus Schultz, 1966

= Xenisthmus =

Genus of fishes

Xenisthmus is a genus of marine ray-finned fish belonging to the family Xenisthmidae, the collared wrigglers. These small benthic fishes are foudn in the Indian and Pacific Oceans.

== Taxonomy ==
Xenisthmus was described in 1908 by John Otterbein Snyder with Xenisthmus proriger, which was described in 1906 by David Starr Jordan and Alvin Seale from American Samoa, designated as its type species, as well as being its type species by monotypy. Xenisthmus has been placed in the family Eleotridae, the sleeper gobies. but is now classified in the family Xenisthmidae, the collared wrigglers. Xenisthmidae is classified within the suborder Gobioidei, the gobies, of the order Gobiiformes, which also includes the cardinalfishes and sand divers.

== Etymology ==
Xenisthmus puts the prefix xenos, meaning "strange" or "foreign", in front of isthmus, thought to be because the type species has gill emembranes that have edges that are no attached to the isthmus. The specific name, semicinctus, means "half belted" or "half girdled", an allusion to the dark blotches on the upper part of the body.

== Species ==
Xenisthmus contains the following species:

- Xenisthmus africanus J. L. B. Smith, 1958 – flathead wriggler or African wriggler
- Xenisthmus aureus Chang, Shen & Chen, 2025
- Xenisthmus balius A. C. Gill & Randall, 1994 – freckled wriggler
- Xenisthmus chapmani (Schultz, 1966)
- Xenisthmus chi Gill & Hoese, 2004 – chi wriggler
- Xenisthmus clarus (Jordan & Seale, 1906) – clear wriggler
- Xenisthmus eirospilus Gill & Hoese, 2004 – spotted wriggler
- Xenisthmus nigrolateralis Chen, Harefa, Jiang & Chang, 2022
- Xenisthmus oligoporus Gill, Bogorodsky & Mal, 2017 -few-pored wriggler
- Xenisthmus polyzonatus (Klunzinger, 1871) – bullseye wriggler or barred wriggler
- Xenisthmus semicinctus Gill & Hoese, 2004 - halfband wriggler

== Characteristics ==
Xenisthmus species have a first dorsal fin which is supported by 6 spines, the second dorsal fin has a single spine and between 11 and 15 rays, in adults all of these rays are branched. The anal fin has 1 spine and between 10 and 14 rays, again, all of the rays are branched in adults. The pectoral fins have between 15 and 18 rays, the majority of these are branched in adults. The pelvic fins have 1 spine and 5 rays, the first 4 rays being branched in adults. Some gill rakers are present. The body has small scales and there are pores on the head.

== Distribution ==
Xenisthmus wrigglers are found in the Indian and Pacific Oceans from the eastern coast of Africa east as far as Polynesia, north to southern Japan and south to Australia. The wrigglers are secretive fishes of coral reefs and rubble areas, they can be found from tidal pools down to depths of around 30 m (98 ft). Xenisthmus wrigglers are "sand divers", inhabiting sandy areas close to reefs or rubble.
