= Rotuma lewisi =

Conservation status
- Least Concern (IUCN 3.1)

Scientific classification
- Kingdom: Animalia
- Phylum: Chordata
- Class: Actinopterygii
- Division: Teleostei
- Order: Gobiiformes
- Family: Eleotridae
- Genus: Rotuma; Springer, 1988
- Species: R. lewisi

Binomial name
- Rotuma lewisi Springer, 1988

Species of fish

Rotuma lewisi, Lewis's wriggler, is a species of marine ray-finned fish belonging to the family Xenisthmidae, the collared wrigglers. This species is found in the south-central Pacific Ocean.

== Taxonomy ==
Rotuma lewisi was first formally described in 1988 by the American ichthyologist Victor G. Springer with its type locality given as a patch reef west of wharf, on the northeastern corner of Rotuma Island, at 12°30'S, 177°05'E, southwestern Pacific, from a depth 10.7 m (35 ft). At the same time as he described the new species Springer also described the new genus Rotuma designating R. lewisi as its type species, as well as being its type species by monotypy. This taxon has been placed in the family Eleotridae, the sleeper gobies. but is now classified in the family Xenisthmidae, the collared wrigglers. Xenisthmidae is classified within the suborder Gobioidei, the gobies, of the order Gobiiformes, which also includes the cardinalfishes and sand divers.

== Etymology ==
Rotuma lewisi is the only species in the genus Rotuma, which is named for the type locality, Rotuma, a volcanic island that is a dependancy of Fiji. The specific name, lewisi honours Anthony D. Lewis, a Fisheries Officer of the Government of Fiji who supported Springer's field work in Fiji.

== Description ==
Rotuma lewisi can be told apart from other collared wrigglers by having 5 spines in the first dorsal fin and having 4 obviously simple, segmented rays in the pelvic fin, with a vestigial fifth ray visible in osteological preparation. This is a largely transparent species with a yellow head and eyes, a yellow abdomen with black spots, yellow spots on the sides, red margins to the fins, a white caudal fin. It reaches a standard length of 2.2 cm (0.87 in).

== Distribution and habitat ==
Rotuma lewisi has been recorded from Fiji and Tonga, the Comoros Islands and the Chesterfield Islands. Reports from elsewhere need confirmation.
