= Cingulate cortex =

Part of the limbic lobe of the brain cortex

- Medial surface of left cerebral hemisphere, with cingulate gyrus, and cingulate sulcus shown in red.

Details
- Part of: Cerebral cortex
- Artery: Anterior cerebral
- Vein: Superior sagittal sinus

Identifiers
- Latin: cortex cingularis, gyrus cinguli
- Acronym: Cg
- MeSH: D006179
- NeuroNames: 159
- NeuroLex ID: birnlex_798
- TA98: A14.1.09.231
- TA2: 5513
- FMA: 62434

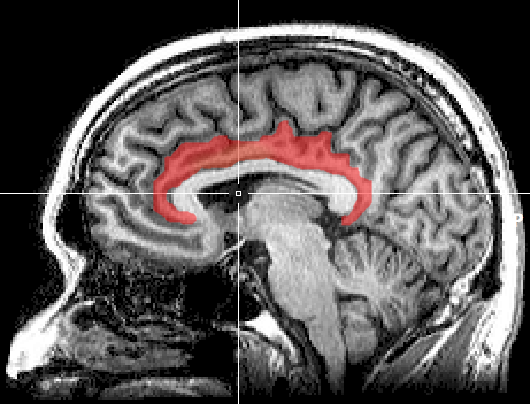
Sagittal MRI slice with highlighting indicating location of the cingulate cortex.

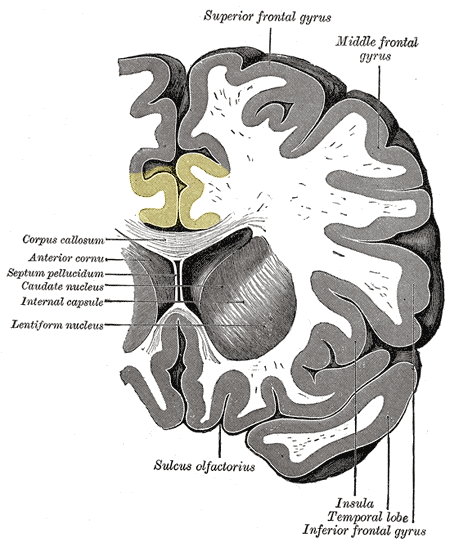
Coronal section of brain. Cingulate cortex is shown in yellow.

The cingulate cortex is a part of the brain situated in the medial aspect of the cerebral cortex. The cingulate cortex includes the entire cingulate gyrus, which lies immediately above the corpus callosum, and the continuation of this in the cingulate sulcus. The cingulate cortex is usually considered part of the limbic lobe.

It receives inputs from the thalamus and the neocortex, and projects to the entorhinal cortex via the cingulum. It is an integral part of the limbic system, which is involved with emotion formation and processing, learning, and memory. The combination of these three functions makes the cingulate gyrus highly influential in linking motivational outcomes to behaviour (e.g. a certain action induced a positive emotional response, which results in learning). This role makes the cingulate cortex highly important in disorders such as depression and schizophrenia. It also plays a role in executive function and respiratory control.

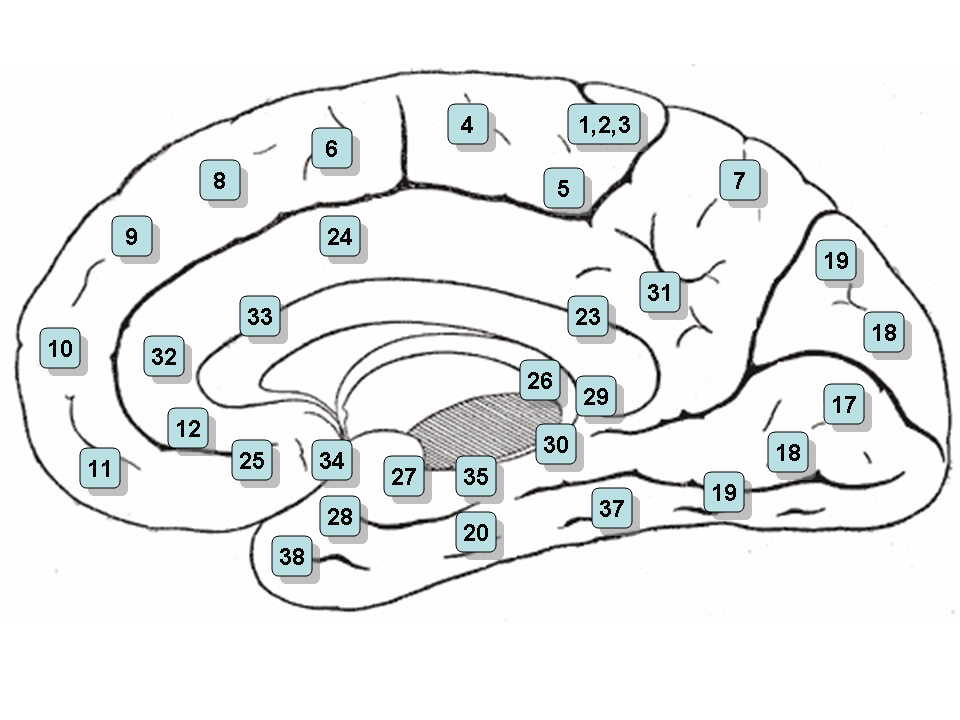
Brodmann areas of a medial section of the right hemisphere.

== Structure ==
Based on cerebral cytoarchitectonics it has been divided into the Brodmann areas 23, 24, 26, 29, 30, 31, 32 and 33. The areas 26, 29 and 30 are usually referred to as the retrosplenial areas.

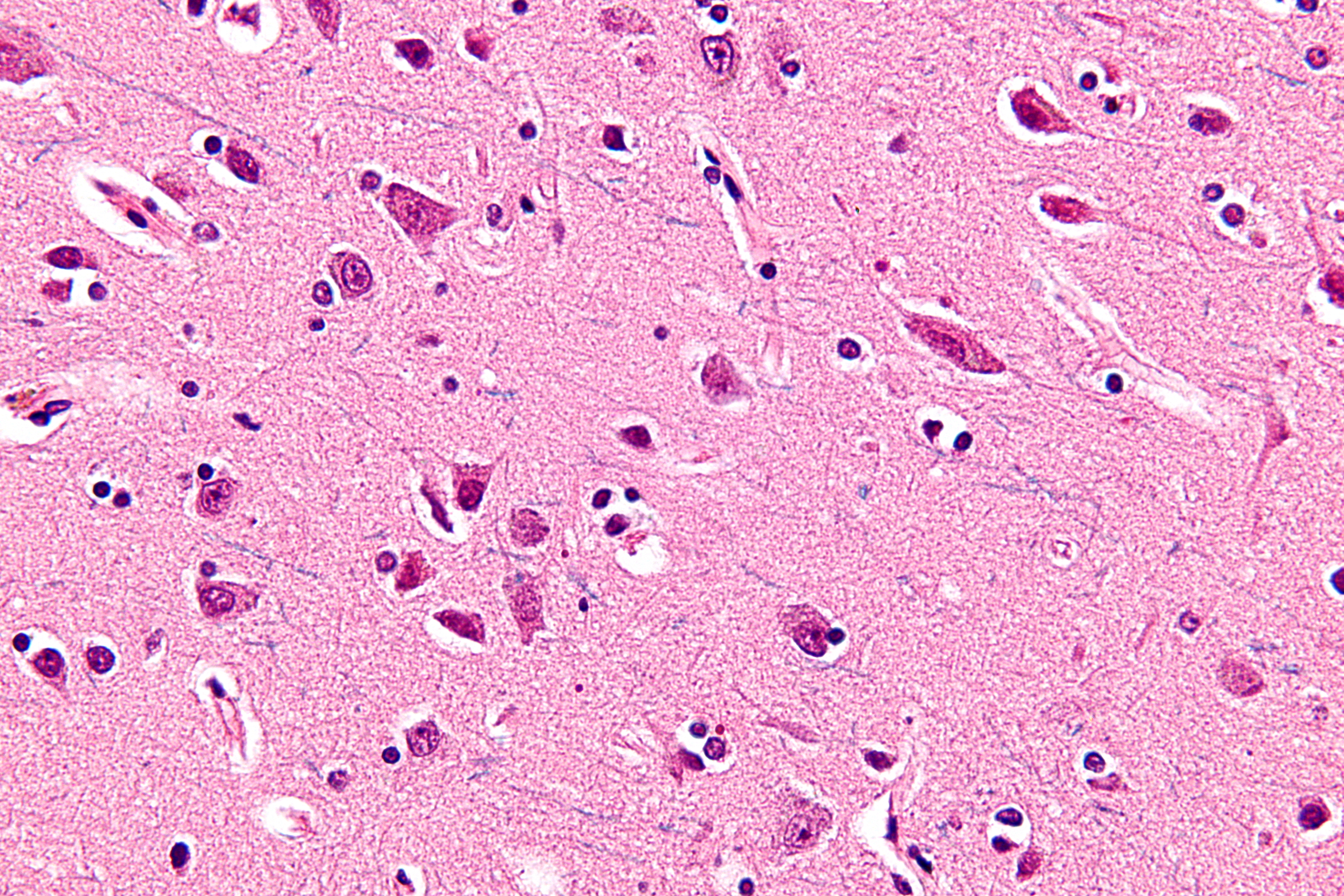
Micrograph showing spindle neurons of the cingulate cortex. HE-LFB stain.

=== Anterior cingulate cortex ===
This corresponds to areas 24, 32 and 33 of Brodmann and LA of Constantin von Economo and Bailey and von Bonin. It is continued anteriorly by the subgenual area (Brodmann area 25), located below the genu of the corpus callosum). It is cytoarchitectonically agranular. It has a gyral and a sulcal part. Anterior cingulate cortex can further be divided in the perigenual anterior cingulate cortex (near the genu) and midcingulate cortex. The anterior cingulate cortex receives primarily its afferent axons from the intralaminar and midline thalamic nuclei (see thalamus). The nucleus anterior receives mamillo-thalamic afferences. The mamillary neurons receive axons from the subiculum. The whole forms a neural circuit in the limbic system known as the Papez circuit. The anterior cingulate cortex sends axons to the anterior nucleus and through the cingulum to other Broca's limbic areas. The ACC is involved in error and conflict detection processes.

=== Posterior cingulate cortex ===
This corresponds to areas 23 and 31 of Brodmann LP of von Economo and Bailey and von Bonin. Its cellular structure is granular. It is followed posteriorly by the retrosplenial cortex (area 29). Dorsally is the granular area 31. The posterior cingulate cortex receives a great part of its afferent axons from the superficial nucleus (or nucleus superior- falsely LD-) of the thalamus (see thalamus), which itself receives axons from the subiculum. To some extent it thus duplicates Papez' circuit. It receives also direct afferents from the subiculum of the hippocampus. Posterior cingulate cortex hypometabolism (with 18F-FDG PET) has been defined in Alzheimer's disease.

=== Inputs of the anterior cingulate gyrus ===
A retrograde tracing experiment on macaque monkeys revealed that the ventral anterior nucleus (VA) and the ventral lateral nucleus (VL) of the thalamus are connected with motor areas of the cingulate sulcus. The retrosplenial region (Brodmann's area 26, 29 and 30) of cingulate gyrus can be divided into three parts: i.e., retrosplenial granular cortex A, retrosplenial granular cortex B and retrosplenial dysgranular cortex. The hippocampal formation sends dense projections to retrosplenial granular cortex A and B and fewer projections to the retrosplenial dysgranular cortex. The postsubiculum sends projections to retrosplenial granular cortex A and B and to the retrosplenial dysgranular cortex. The dorsal subiculum sends projections to retrosplenial granular cortex B, while ventral subiculum sends projections to retrosplenial granular cortex A. Entorhinal cortex – caudal parts – sends projections to the retrosplenial dysgranular cortex.

=== Outputs of the anterior cingulate gyrus ===
The rostral cingulate gyrus (Brodmanns's area 32) projects to the rostral superior temporal gyrus, midorbitofrontal cortex and lateral prefrontal cortex. The ventral anterior cingulate (Brodmann's area 24) sends projections to the anterior insular cortex, premotor cortex (Brodmann's area 6), Brodmann's area 8, the perirhinal area, the orbitofrontal cortex (Brodmann's area 12), the laterobasal nucleus of amygdala, and the rostral part of the inferior parietal lobule. Injecting wheat germ agglutinin and horseradish peroxidase conjugate into the anterior cingulate gyrus of cats, revealed that the anterior cingulate gyrus has reciprocal connections with the rostral part of the thalamic posterior lateral nucleus and rostral end of the pulvinar. The postsubiculum receives projections from the retrosplenial dysgranular cortex and the retrosplenial granular cortex A and B. The parasubiculum receives projections from the retrosplenial dysgranular cortex and retrosplenial granular cortex A. Caudal and lateral parts of the entorhinal cortex get projections from the retrosplenial dysgranular cortex, while the caudal medial entorhinal cortex receives projections from the retrosplenial granular cortex A. The retrosplenial dysgranular cortex sends projections to the perirhinal cortex. The retrosplenial granular cortex A sends projection to the rostral presubiculum.

=== Outputs of the posterior cingulate gyrus ===
The posterior cingulate cortex (Brodmann's area 23) sends projections to dorsolateral prefrontal cortex (Brodmann's area 9), anterior prefrontal cortex (Brodmann's area 10), orbitofrontal cortex (Brodmanns’ area 11), the parahippocampal gyrus, posterior part of the inferior parietal lobule, the presubiculum, the superior temporal sulcus and the retrosplenial region. The retrosplenial cortex and caudal part of the cingulate cortex are connected with rostral prefrontal cortex via cingulate fascicule in macaque monkeys Ventral posterior cingulate cortex was found to be reciprocally connected with the caudal part of the posterior parietal lobe in rhesus monkeys. Also the medial posterior parietal cortex is connected with posterior ventral bank of the cingulate sulcus.

=== Other connections ===
The anterior cingulate is connected to the posterior cingulate at least in rabbits. Posterior cingulate gyrus is connected with retrosplenial cortex and this connection is part of the dorsal splenium of the corpus callosum. The anterior and posterior cingulate gyrus and retrosplenial cortex send projections to subiculum and presubiculum.

In a study of the cingulate gyrus in monkeys, it was found that the two cingulates form a network including the caudate nucleus, the claustrum, the thalamic nuclei (AM AV LD), the lateral prefrontal cortex and the posterior parietal cortex.

== Clinical significance ==
=== Schizophrenia ===
People with schizophrenia have differences in the anterior cingulate gyrus when compared with controls. The anterior cingulate gyrus was found to be smaller in people with schizophrenia. The volume of the gray matter in the anterior cingulate gyrus was found to be lower in people with schizophrenia. Healthy females have larger rostral anterior cingulate gyrus than males, this sex difference in size is absent in people with schizophrenia. The metabolic rate of glucose was lower in the left anterior cingulate gyrus and in the right posterior cingulate gyrus.

In addition to changes in the cingulate cortex more brain structures show changes in people with schizophrenia as compared to controls. The hippocampus in people with schizophrenia was found to be smaller in size when compared with controls of the same age group, and, similarly, the caudate and putamen were found to be smaller in volume in a longitudinal study of people with schizophrenia. While the volume of gray matter is smaller, the size of the lateral and third ventricles is larger in people with schizophrenia.

=== Depression ===
The cingulate gyrus is heavily implicated in depressive disorders. The subgenual region, which lies below the genu of the corpus callosum, is especially important. This site is the target of deep-brain stimulation therapy for depression, an invasive therapy used when all other treatment methods have failed.

Isolated stroke of the cingulate gyrus has also been found to induce depression, potentially implicating this region in post-stroke depression which may occur following stroke of a larger part of the brain.

=== Age-related cognitive impairment ===
The cingulate cortex plays a key role in cognitive aging, particularly in the cingulo-opercular. Greater connectivity in the cingulo-opercular network is linked to better episodic memory, attention, and executive function, but declines with age, impacting cognitive performance. Reduced connectivity in the anterior cingulate cortex within the salience network correlates with cognitive decline. Age-related decreases in cingulo-opercular connectivity, especially in the left insula, mediate declines in visual processing speed. Its predictive value in aging models highlights its potential as a biomarker for cognitive decline.

== History ==
Cingulum means "belt" in Latin. The name was likely chosen because this cortex, in great part, surrounds the corpus callosum. The cingulate cortex is a part of the "grand lobe limbique" of Broca (1878) that consisted of a superior cingulate part (supracallosal) and an inferior hippocampic part (infracallosal). The limbic lobe was separated from the remainder of the cortex by Broca for two reasons: first because it is not convoluted, and second because the gyri are directed parasagittally (contrary to the transverse gyrification). Since the parasagittal gyrification is observed in non-primate species, the limbic lobe was thus declared to be "bestial". As with other parts of the cortex, there have been and continue to be discrepancies concerning boundaries and naming. Brodmann (1909) further distinguished Areas 24 (anterior cingulate) and 23 (posterior) based on granularity. More recently, it was included as a part of the limbic lobe in the Terminologia Anatomica (1998) following von Economo's (1925) system.

== Additional images ==
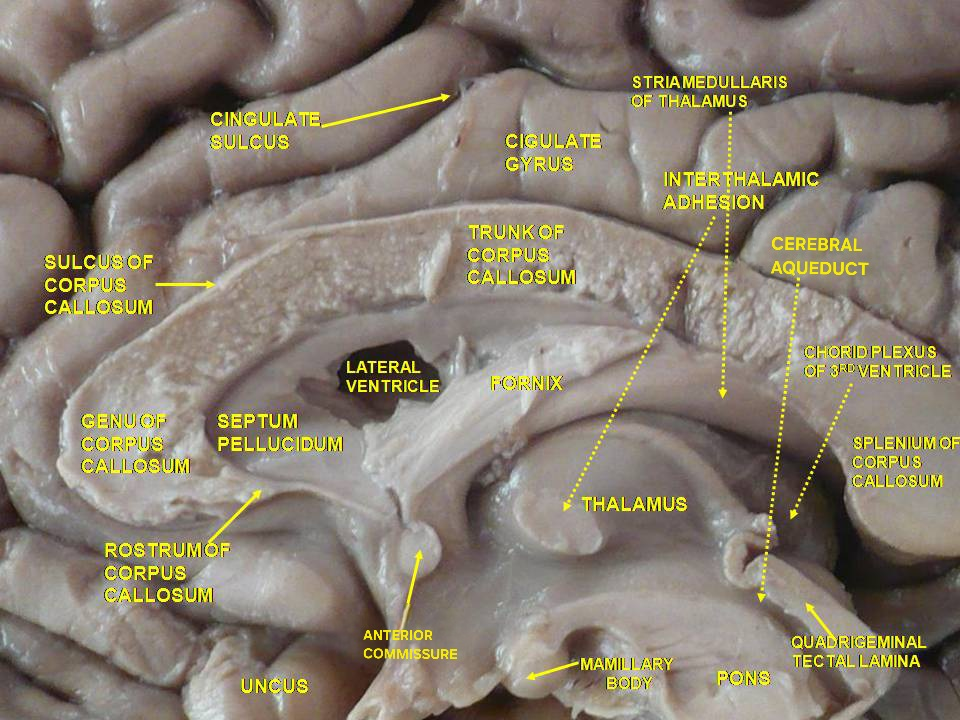
Medial sagittal section of the human brain.

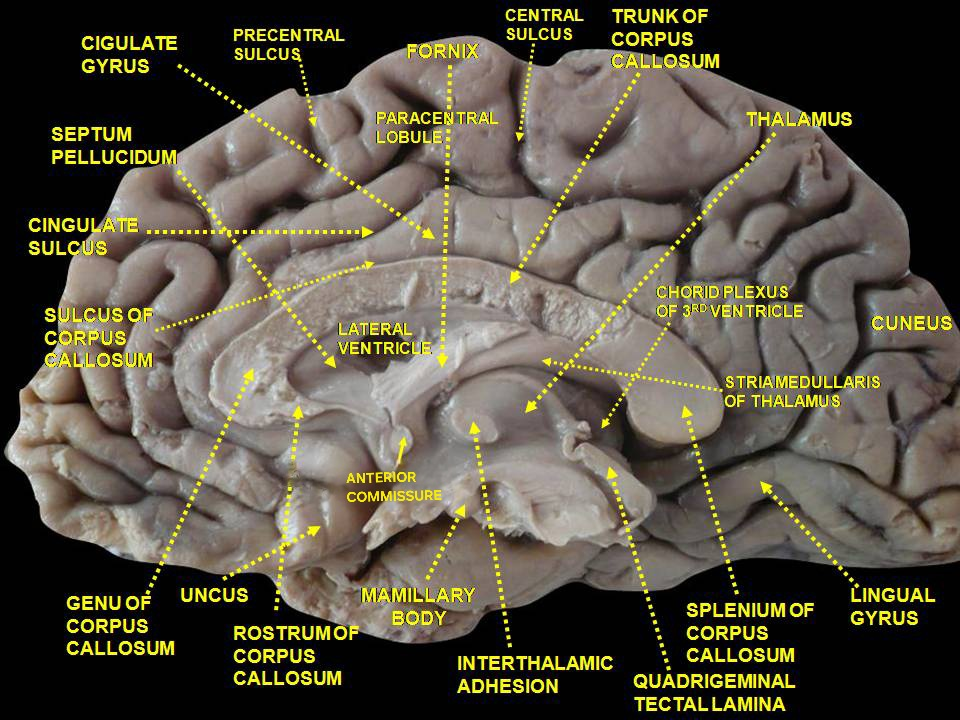
Median sagittal section of the human brain.

3D view of the cingulate gyrus (green) and paracingulate gyrus (yellow) in an average human brain
