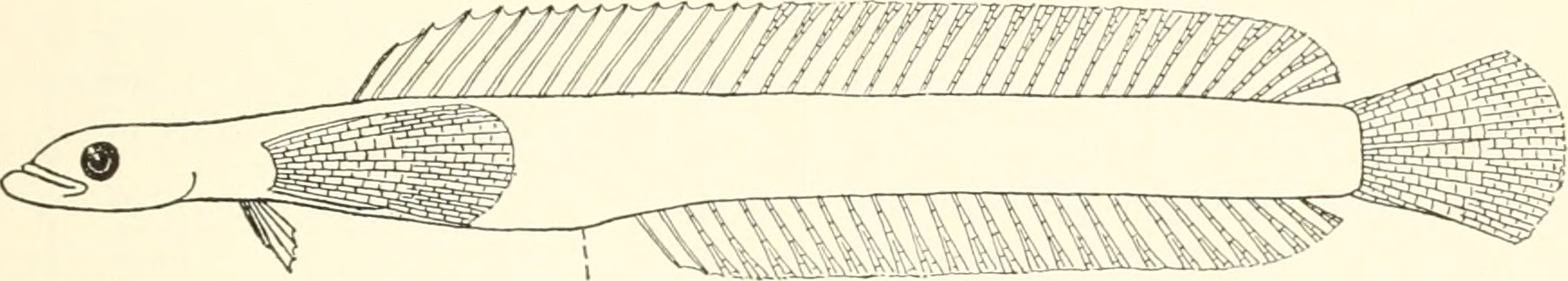
- Allomicrodesmus dorotheae

Scientific classification
- Kingdom: Animalia
- Phylum: Chordata
- Class: Actinopterygii
- Division: Teleostei
- Order: Gobiiformes
- Suborder: Gobioidei
- Family: Xenisthmidae

Genera
- see text

= Xenisthmidae =

Collared wrigglers

Family of fishes

Collared wrigglers are perciform fishes in the family Xenisthmidae. They are native to the Indian and Pacific Oceans, where they are mostly reef-dwelling.

== Species ==
The 10 species in 7 genera are:

- Genus Allomicrodesmus Schultz, 1966

- Allomicrodesmus dorotheae Schultz, 1966

- Genus Gymnoxenisthmus Gill, Bogorodsky & Mal, 2014

- Gymnoxenisthmus flavicinctus Gill, Bogorodsky & Mal, 2019
- Gymnoxenisthmus tigrellus Gill, Bogorodsky & Mal, 2014

- Genus Paraxenisthmus Gill & Hoese, 1993

- Paraxenisthmus cerberusi Winterbottom & Gill, 2006
- Paraxenisthmus springeri Gill & Hoese, 1993

- Genus Rotuma Springer, 1988

- Rotuma lewisi Springer, 1988

- Genus Tyson Springer, 1983

- Tyson belos Springer, 1983

- Genus Xenisthmus Snyder, 1908

- Xenisthmus africanus Smith, 1958 (the flathead wriggler or African wriggler)
- Xenisthmus balius Gill & Randall, 1994
- Xenisthmus chi Gill & Hoese, 2004
- Xenisthmus chapmani (Schultz, 1966)
- Xenisthmus clarus (Jordan & Seale, 1906)
- Xenisthmus eirospilus Gill & Hoese, 2004
- Xenisthmus polyzonatus (Klunzinger, 1871) (the bull's-eye wriggler or polyzonate wriggler) is peach-coloured with a bull's-eye-like spot on its tail.
- Xenisthmus semicinctus Gill & Hoese, 2004
