= Isthmus of cingulate gyrus =

Inner region of the brain

Isthmus of cingulate gyrus( Brodmann area 29)
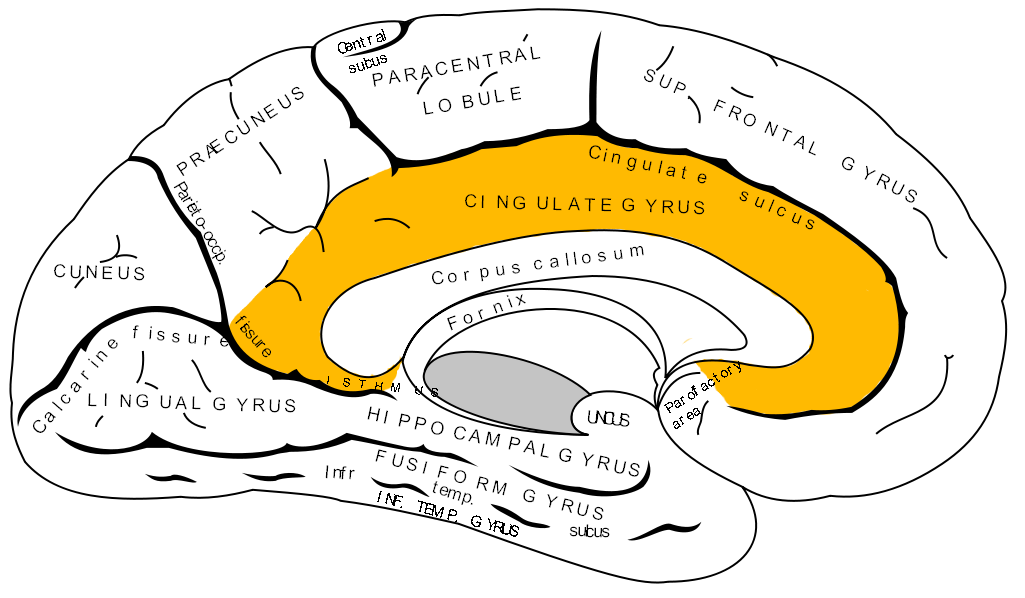
- Medial surface of left cerebral hemisphere. (Isthmus labeled at left center.)

Details

Identifiers
- Latin: isthmus gyri cinguli
- NeuroNames: 163
- NeuroLex ID: birnlex_1541
- TA98: A14.1.09.232
- TA2: 5514
- FMA: 62502

The cingulate gyrus commences below the rostrum of the corpus callosum, curves around in front of the genu, extends along the upper surface of the body, and finally turns downward behind the splenium, where it is connected by a narrow isthmus with the parahippocampal gyrus.

== Additional images ==
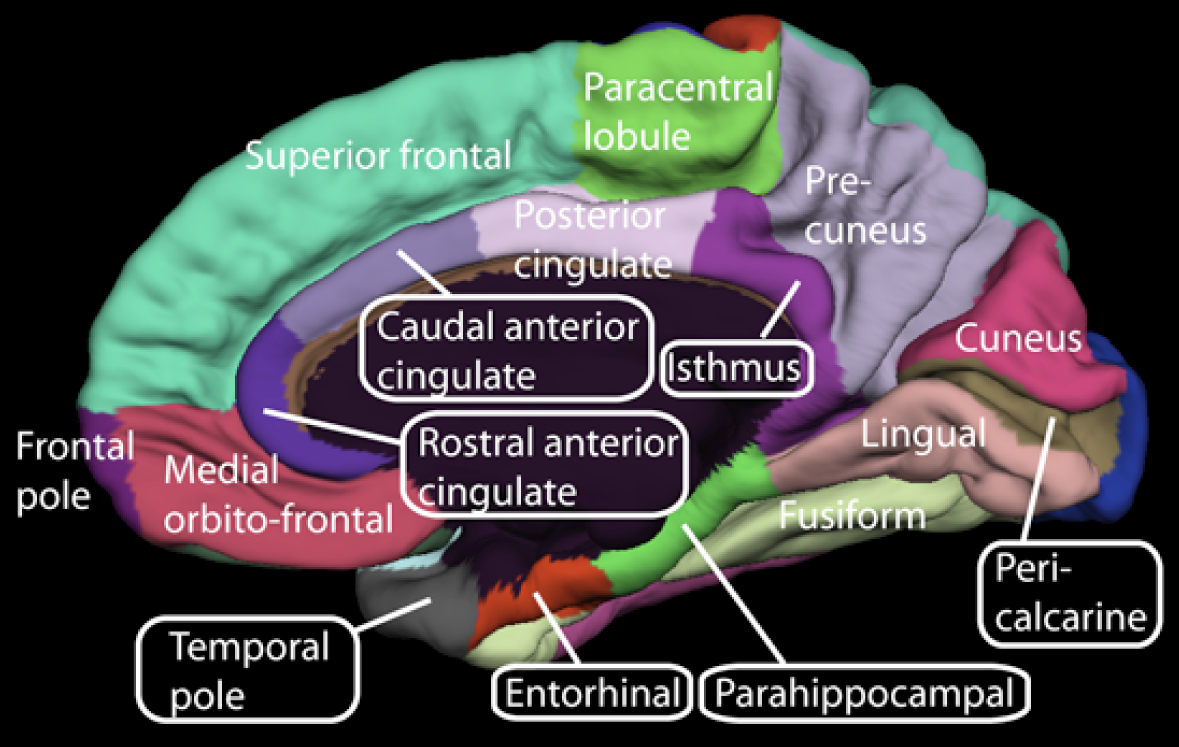
Medial surface of cerebral cortex - gyri

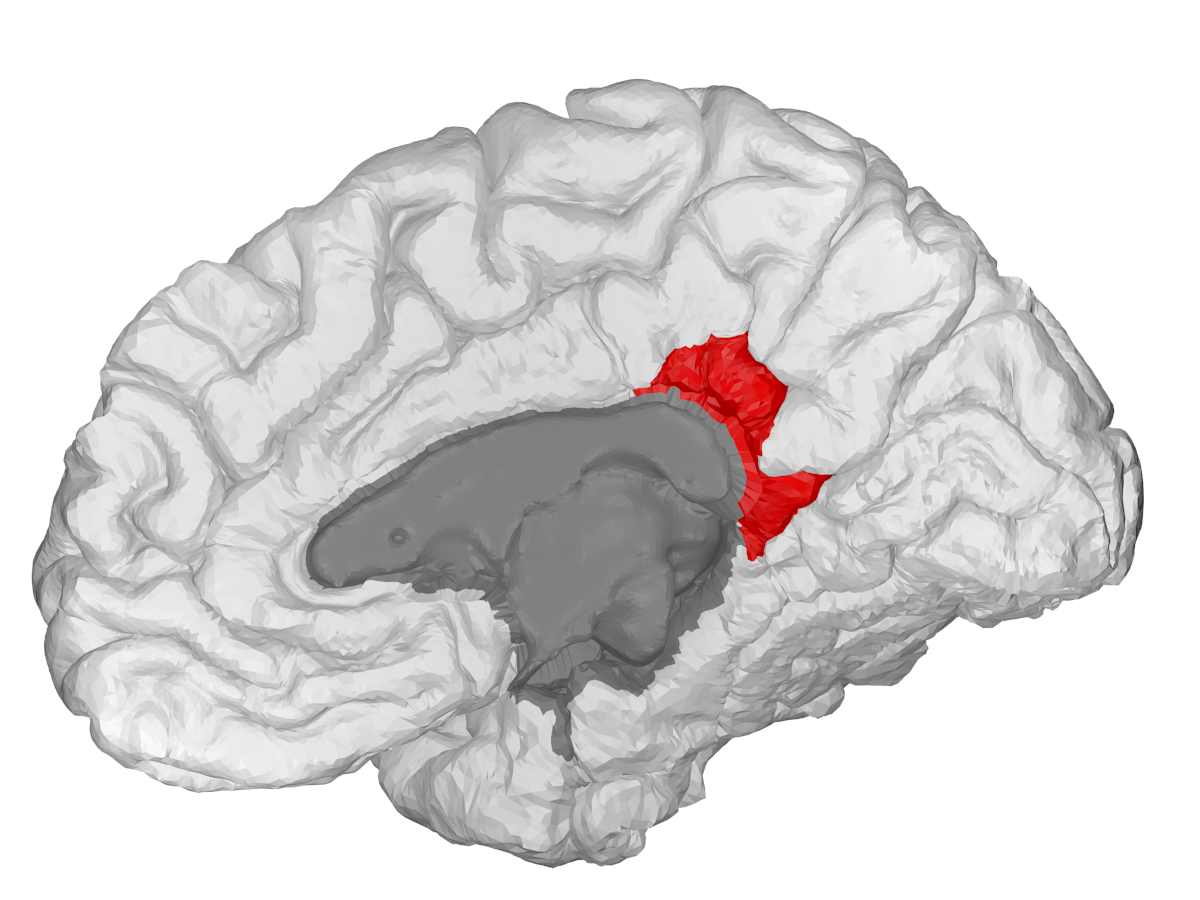
Isthmus of the cingulate gyrus, medial surface of right hemisphere
