= Brodmann area 30 =

Brain region in the retrosplenial cortex

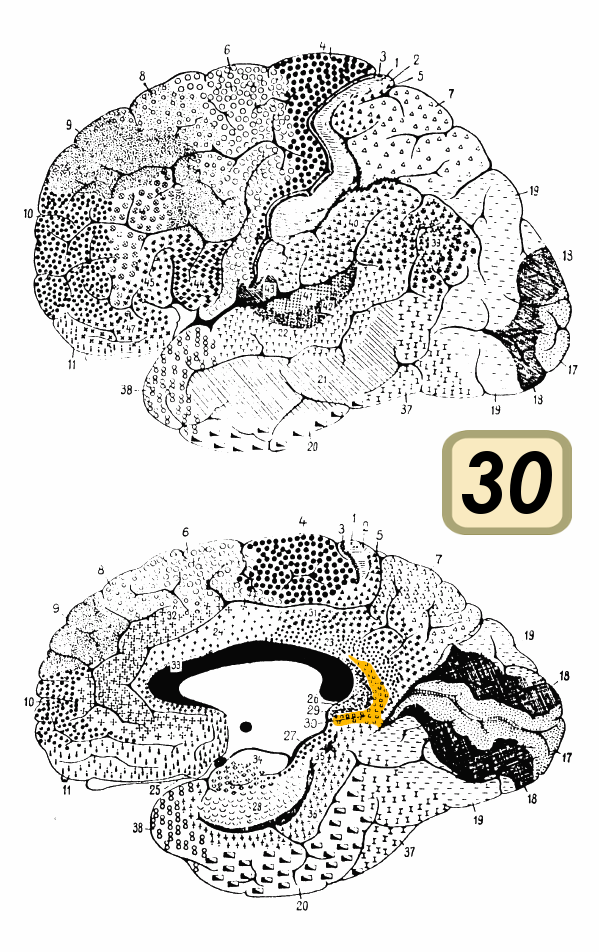

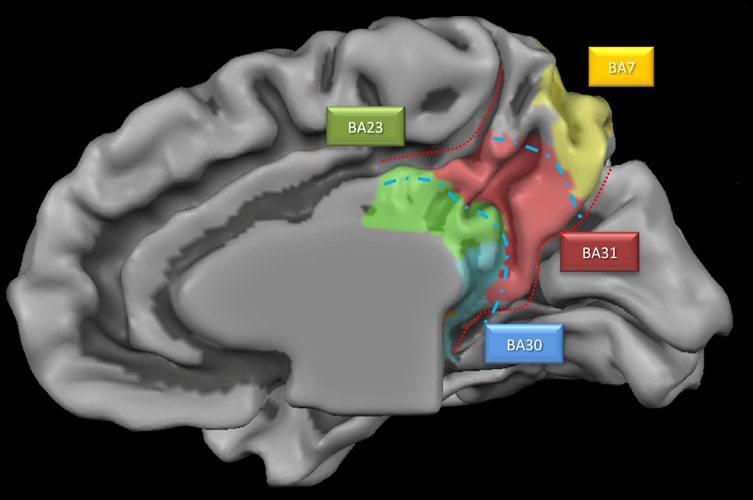
- Medial surface of human brain. BA23 is shown in blue.

Details

Identifiers
- Latin: area retrosplenialis agranularis
- NeuroLex ID: birnlex_1764
- FMA: 68627

Brodmann area 30, also known as agranular retrolimbic area 30, is a subdivision of the cytoarchitecturally defined retrosplenial region of the cerebral cortex. In the human it is located in the isthmus of cingulate gyrus. Cytoarchitecturally it is bounded internally by the granular retrolimbic area 29, dorsally by the ventral posterior cingulate area 23 and ventrolaterally by the ectorhinal area 36 (Brodmann-1909).

In primates, Brodmann area 30 demonstrates projections to the mid-dorsolateral prefrontal cortex (Brodmann areas 46 and 9) and the thalamus. Additionally, approximately 20% of cortical inputs to the entorhinal cortex arise from the retrosplenial cortex.

Individuals with lesions to retrosplenial cortex, predominantly Brodmann’s area 30, demonstrate dysfunction in their topographical orientation, including defective navigation in novel and familiar environments.

== See also ==
- Brodmann area
- Retrosplenial cortex
