= Retrosplenial cortex =

Part of the brain's cerebral cortex

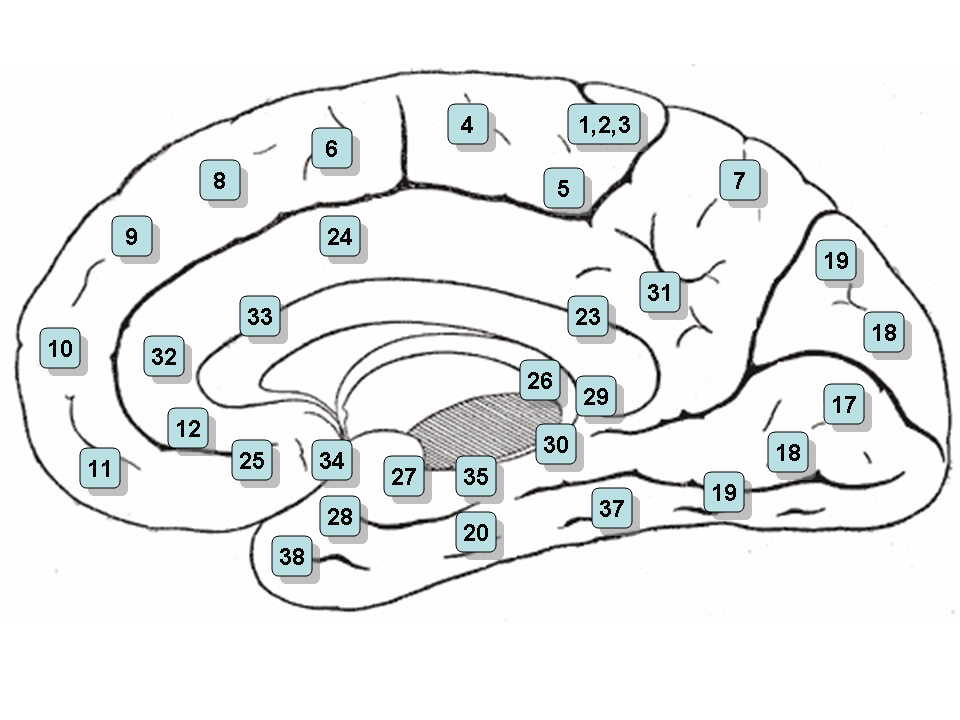
- Medial surface of the brain with Brodmann's areas numbered.

Details

Identifiers
- Latin: regio retrosplenialis
- NeuroNames: 2436, 1802

The retrosplenial cortex (RSC) is a cortical area in the brain comprising Brodmann areas 29 and 30. It is secondary association cortex, making connections with numerous other brain regions. The region's name refers to its anatomical location immediately behind the splenium of the corpus callosum in primates, although in rodents it is located more towards the brain surface and is relatively larger. Its function is currently not well understood, but its location close to visual areas and also to the hippocampal spatial/memory system suggest it may have a role in mediating between perceptual and memory functions, particularly in the spatial domain. However, its exact contribution to either space or memory processing has been hard to pin down.

== Anatomy ==
There is large variation in the region's size across different species. In humans it comprises roughly 0.3% of the entire cortical surface whereas in rabbits it is at least 10% and in rats it extends for more than half the cerebrum dorso-ventrally, making it one of the largest cortical regions.

On the basis of its microscopic cellular structure it is divided into dysgranular (area 30) and granular (area 29) regions. These have been divided into four areas: 29l, 29m, 30l, and 30m. It has dense reciprocal projections with the visual cortex, postsubiculum (also known as dorsal presubiculum) and with anterior thalamic nuclei and the hippocampus.

== Neurophysiology ==
Neurophysiological studies of retrosplenial cortex have mainly been done in rats. Early work showed that around 8.5% of neurons in the retrosplenial cortex are head direction cells while other neurons have correlated with movement parameters such as spatial location and running speed. Recent studies have shown that retrosplenial neuronal activity reflects multiple parameters simultaneously including which environment the animal is currently in, its spatial position in the environment, its current head direction and running speed, as well as whether the animal is turning or plans to turn in the future. Many of these features of retrosplenial neurophysiology develop slowly as the animal learns to navigate within an environment, consistent with the idea that the retrosplenial cortex participates in the long-term storage of spatial memory.

== Function ==
In humans, fMRI studies implicate the retrosplenial cortex in a wide range of cognitive functions including episodic memory, navigation, imagining future events and processing scenes more generally. Rodent studies suggest the region is important for using surrounding visual cues to carry out these tasks. Retrosplenial cortex is particularly responsive to permanent, non-moving environmental landmarks and is also implicated in using them to make spatial judgements. A review in 2023 suggested its function was "spatial navigation and localization of personally relevant objects".

It has also been suggested that retrosplenial cortex may translate between egocentric (self-centred) and allocentric (world-centred) spatial information, based upon its anatomical location between the hippocampus (where there are allocentric place cell representations) and the parietal lobe (which integrates egocentric sensory information).

Competitors in the World Memory Championships are able to perform outstanding feats of memory and show increased fMRI activation in their retrosplenial cortex than normal controls when doing so. This is thought to be due to their use of a spatial learning strategy or mnemonic device known as the method of loci.

The region also displays slow-wave theta rhythmicity and when people retrieve autobiographical memories, there is theta band interaction between the retrosplenial cortex and the medial temporal lobe.

== Pathology ==
The retrosplenial cortex is one of several brain areas that produces both an anterograde and retrograde amnesia when damaged. People with lesions involving the retrosplenial cortex also display a form of topographical disorientation whereby they can recognise and identify environmental landmarks, but are unable to use them to orientate themselves.

The retrosplenial cortex is one of the first regions to undergo pathological changes in Alzheimer's disease and its prodromal phase of mild cognitive impairment. There are also experimental findings showing that layer 5 of the retrosplenial cortex is likely responsible for dissociative states of consciousness in mammals.

== Gallery ==
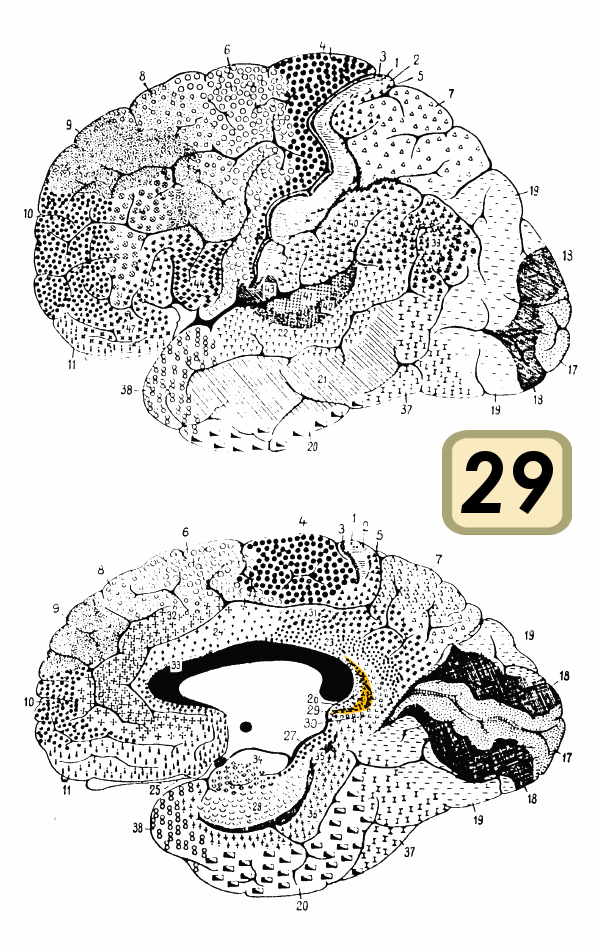
Brodmann area 29

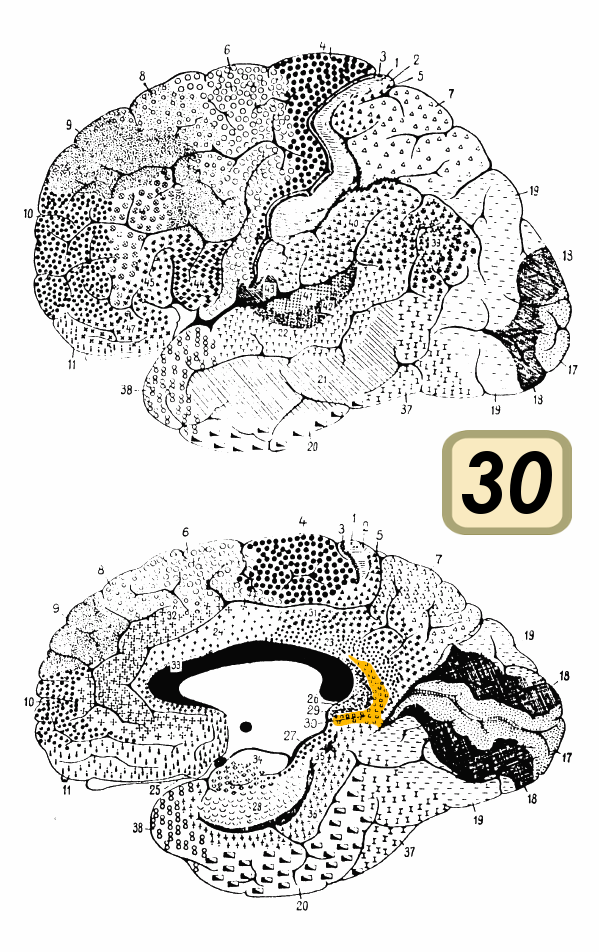
Brodmann area 30
