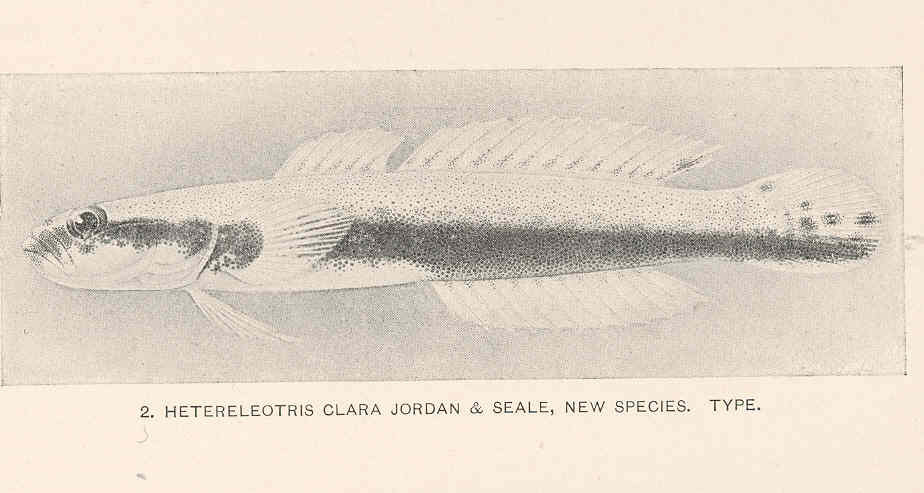

Conservation status
- Least Concern (IUCN 3.1)

Scientific classification
- Kingdom: Animalia
- Phylum: Chordata
- Class: Actinopterygii
- Division: Teleostei
- Order: Gobiiformes
- Family: Xenisthmidae
- Genus: Xenisthmus
- Species: X. clarus

Binomial name
- Xenisthmus clarus (Jordan & Seale, 1906)

Synonyms
- Hetereleotris clara Jordan & Seale, 1906; Xenisthmus proriger Snyder, 1908; Gignimentum penicillum, Whitley, 1933

= Xenisthmus clarus =

Species of fish

Xenisthmus clarus, clear wriggler, is a species of marine ray-finned fish belonging to the family Xenisthmidae, the collared wrigglers. This species is found in the eastern Indian and western Pacific Oceans.

== Taxonomy ==
Xenisthmus clarus was first formally described as Hetereleotris clara in 1906 by the American ichthyologists David Starr Jordan and Alvin Seale with its type locality given as Pago Pago, American Samoa. This species is classified in the genus Xenisthmus which was described in 1908 by John Otterbein Snyder with Xenisthmus proriger designated as its type species, as well as being its type species by monotypy. Xenisthmus proriger is now regarded as a synonym of Hetereleotris clara. Xenisthmus has been placed in the family Eleotridae, the sleeper gobies. but is now classified in the family Xenisthmidae, the collared wrigglers. Xenisthmidae is classified within the suborder Gobioidei, the gobies, of the order Gobiiformes, which also includes the cardinalfishes and sand divers.

== Etymology ==
Xenisthmus clarus is classified in the genus Xenisthmus, a name which puts the prefix xenos, meaning "strange" or "foreign", in front of isthmus, thought to be because the type species has gill emembranes that have edges that are no attached to the isthmus. The specific name, clarus, means "bright" or "distinct", or in other words "clear", ana llusion to the naked, transluscent body.

== Description ==
Xenisthmus clarus reaches a maximum total length of 2.4 cm (0.94 in). This species has a naked, scaless, transluscent body. The body has a dense marking of dark brown spots and a dark brown band that starts at the snout and ends on the upper lobe of the otherwise yellowish caudal fin.

== Distribution and habitat ==
Xenisthmus clarus is found in the western Pacific Ocean where it has been recorded from the Ryukyu Islands, Curtis Island, the Ashmore and Cartier Reefs, Samoa and American Samoa, Vanuatu, Enewetak Atoll, Milne Bay and Maiwara Island west of Alotau in Papua New Guinea, Mindoro, Maestre de Campo, in the Philippines and Fiji, as well as Cocos (Keeling) Island, Indian Ocean. This is a benthic, inshore species, occurring in intertidal and coral reef areas, where there are sandy substrates. They have also been collected from exposed reef flats, buried in the sand.
