= List of anatomical isthmi =

In anatomy, "isthmus" refers to a constriction between organs. This is a list of anatomical isthmi:

- Aortic isthmus, section of the aortic arch
- Cavo-tricuspid isthmus of the right atrium of the heart, a body of fibrous tissue in the lower atrium between the inferior vena cava and the tricuspid valve
- Isthmus, the ear side of the eustachian tube
- Isthmus, the narrowed part between the trunk and the splenium of the corpus callosum
- Isthmus, formation of the shell membrane in birds' oviducts
- Isthmus lobe, a lobe in the prostate
- Isthmus of cingulate gyrus
- Isthmus of fauces, opening at the back of the mouth into the throat
- Isthmus organizer, a secondary organizer region at the junction of the midbrain and metencephalon
- Isthmus tubae uterinae, which links the fallopian tube to the uterus
- Kronig isthmus, a band of resonance representing the apex of the lung
- Thyroid isthmus, a thin band of tissue connecting some of the lobes that make up the thyroid
- Uterine isthmus, the inferior-posterior part of the uterus
