= Brodmann area =

52 distinct regions of the brain's cerebral cortex

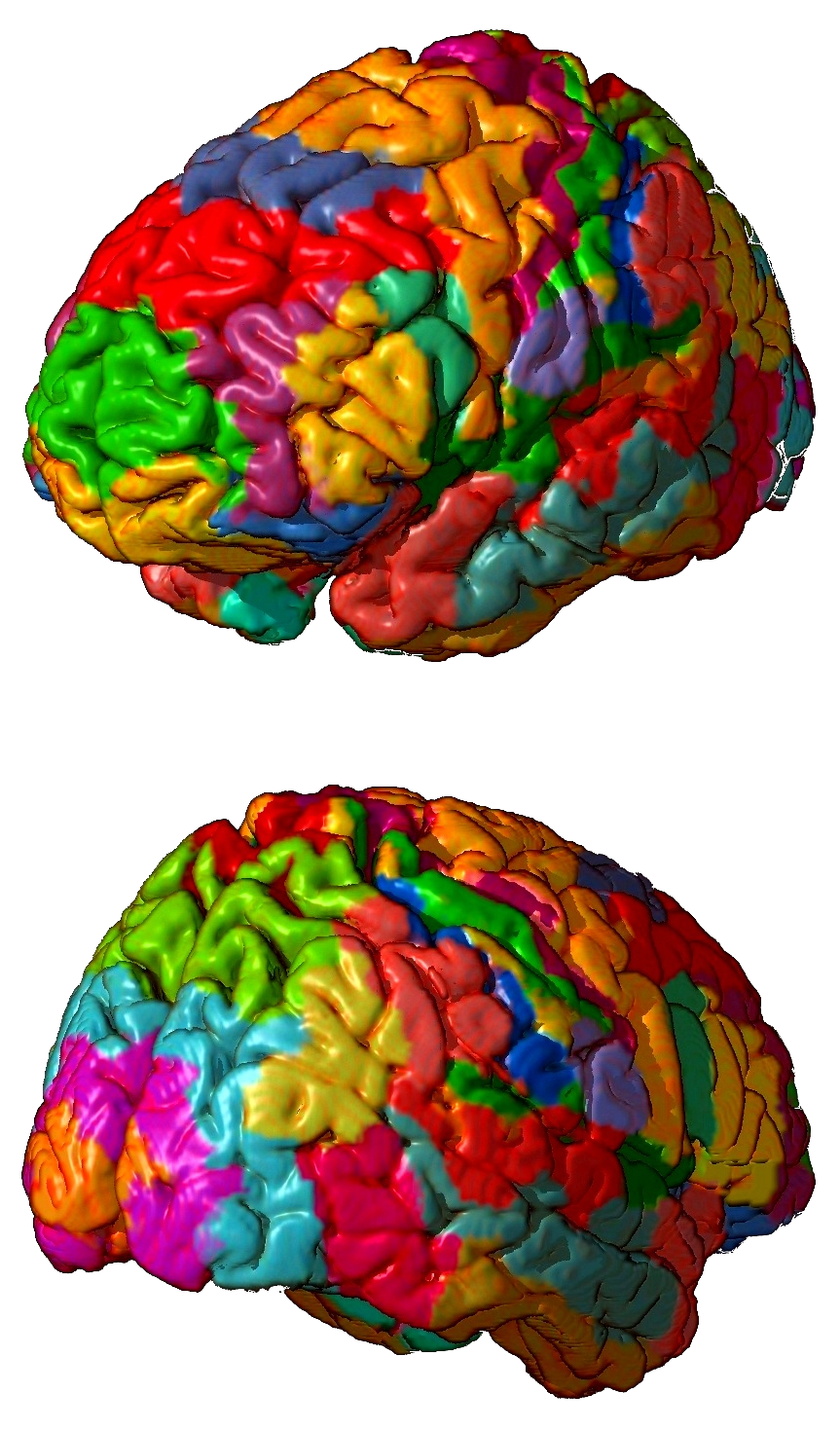
- 3D representation of Brodmann areas

Details
- Part of: Cerebrum

Identifiers
- NeuroNames: 427
- FMA: 68596

A Brodmann area is a region of the cerebral cortex, in the human or other primate brain, defined by its cytoarchitecture, or histological structure and organization of cells. The concept was first introduced by the German anatomist Korbinian Brodmann in the early 20th century. Brodmann mapped the human brain based on the varied cellular structure across the cortex and identified 52 distinct regions, which he numbered 1 to 52. These regions, or Brodmann areas, correspond to diverse functions including sensation, motor control, and cognition.

== History ==
Brodmann areas were originally defined and numbered by the German anatomist Korbinian Brodmann based on the cytoarchitectural organization of neurons he observed in the cerebral cortex using the Nissl method of cell staining. Brodmann published his maps of cortical areas in humans, monkeys, and other species in 1909, along with many other findings and observations regarding the general cell types and laminar organization of the mammalian cortex. The same Brodmann area number in different species does not necessarily indicate homologous areas. A similar, but more detailed cortical map was published by Constantin von Economo and Georg N. Koskinas in 1925.

== Importance ==
Brodmann areas have been discussed, debated, refined, and renamed exhaustively for nearly a century and remain the most widely known and frequently cited cytoarchitectural organization of the human cortex. Many of the areas Brodmann defined based solely on their neuronal organization have since been closely correlated with diverse cortical functions. For example, Brodmann areas 1, 2 and 3 are the primary somatosensory cortex; area 4 is the primary motor cortex; area 17 is the primary visual cortex; and areas 41 and 42 correspond closely to primary auditory cortex. Higher order functions of the association cortical areas are also consistently localized to the same Brodmann areas by neurophysiological, functional imaging, and other methods (e.g., the consistent localization of Broca's speech and language area to the left Brodmann areas 44 and 45). However, functional imaging can only identify the approximate localization of brain activations in terms of Brodmann areas since their actual boundaries in any individual brain require its histological examination.

== Overview ==
Brodmann's classification of areas of the cortex

Different parts of the cerebral cortex are involved in different cognitive and behavioral functions. The differences show up in a number of ways: the effects of localized brain damage, regional activity patterns exposed when the brain is examined using functional imaging techniques, connectivity with subcortical areas, and regional differences in the cellular architecture of the cortex. The neocortex is divided into six layers, but not all layers are apparent in all areas, and the thickness and cellular organization of a single layer may vary. Maps of cortical areas are constructed on the basis of variations in the appearance of the layers as seen with a microscope.

Korbinian Brodmann created one of the most widely used schemes, splitting the cortex into 52 different areas and assigned each a number (many of these Brodmann areas have since been subdivided). For example, Brodmann area 1 is the primary somatosensory cortex, Brodmann area 17 is the primary visual cortex, and Brodmann area 25 is the anterior cingulate cortex.

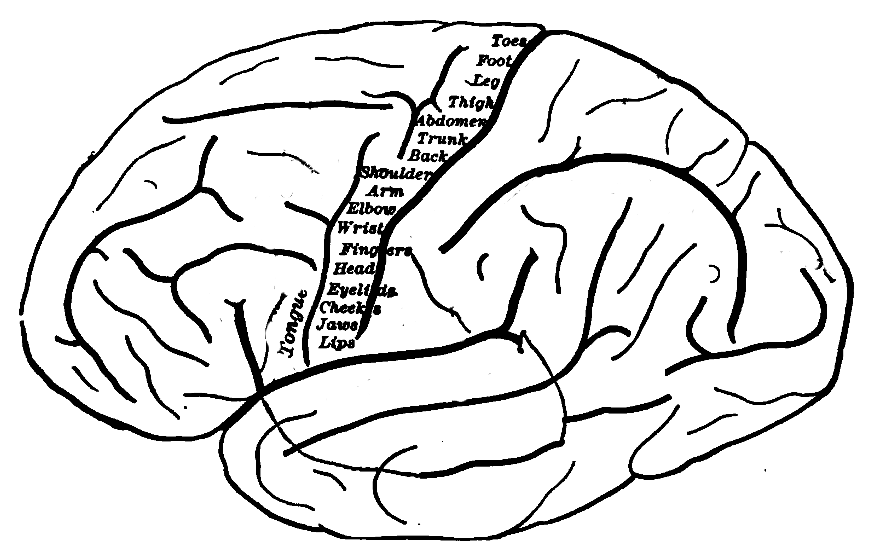
Topography of the primary motor cortex, showing which zone controls each body part

Many of the brain areas defined by Brodmann have their own complex internal structures. In a number of cases, brain areas are organized into topographic maps, where adjoining bits of the cortex correspond to adjoining parts of the body, or of some more abstract entity. A simple example of this type of correspondence is the primary motor cortex, a strip of tissue running along the anterior edge of the central sulcus. Motor areas innervating each part of the body arise from a distinct zone, with neighboring body parts represented by neighboring zones. Electrical stimulation of the cortex at any point causes a muscle-contraction in the represented body part. This "somatotopic" representation is not evenly distributed, however; the head, for example, is represented by a region about three times as large as the zone for the entire back and trunk. The size of any zone correlates to the precision of motor control and sensory discrimination possible. The areas for the lips, fingers, and tongue are particularly large, considering the proportional size of their represented body parts.

The maps for visual areas are retinotopic(reflecting the topography of the retina). This representation is uneven, with the fovea (the area at the center of the visual field) overrepresented compared to the periphery. The visual circuitry in the human cerebral cortex contains several dozen distinct retinotopic maps, each devoted to analyzing the visual input stream in a particular way. The primary visual cortex (Brodmann area 17) contains many neurons that are most easily activated by edges with a particular orientation moving across a particular point in the visual field. Visual areas farther downstream extract features such as color, motion, and shape.

In auditory areas, the primary map is tonotopic. Sounds are parsed according to frequency (i.e., high pitch vs. low pitch) by subcortical auditory areas, and this parsing is reflected by the primary auditory zone of the cortex. As with the visual system, there are a number of tonotopic cortical maps, each devoted to analyzing sound in a particular way.

Within a topographic map there can sometimes be finer levels of spatial structure. In the primary visual cortex, for example, where the main organization is retinotopic and the main responses are to moving edges, cells that respond to different edge-orientations are spatially segregated from one another.

== For humans and other primates ==
- Areas 3, 1 and 2 – Primary somatosensory cortex in the postcentral gyrus (frequently referred to as Areas 3, 1, 2 by convention)
- Area 4– Primary motor cortex
- Area 5 – Superior parietal lobule
- Area 6 – Premotor cortex and supplementary motor cortex (secondary motor cortex) (supplementary motor area)
- Area 7 – Visuo-motor coordination
- Area 8 – Includes frontal eye fields
- Area 9 – Dorsolateral prefrontal cortex
- Area 10 – Anterior prefrontal cortex (most rostral part of superior and middle frontal gyri)
- Area 11 – Orbitofrontal area (orbital and rectus gyri, plus part of the rostral part of the superior frontal gyrus)
- Area 12 – Orbitofrontal area (used to be part of BA11, refers to the area between the superior frontal gyrus and the inferior rostral sulcus)
- Area 13 and Area 14^{*} – Insular cortex
- Area 15^{*} – Anterior temporal lobe
- Area 16 – Insular cortex
- Area 17 – Primary visual cortex (V1)
- Area 18 – Secondary visual cortex (V2)
- Area 19 – Associative visual cortex (V3, V4, V5)
- Area 20 – Inferior temporal gyrus
- Area 21 – Middle temporal gyrus
- Area 22 – Part of the superior temporal gyrus, included in Wernicke's area
- Area 23 – Ventral posterior cingulate cortex
- Area 24 – Ventral anterior cingulate cortex.
- Area 25 – Subgenual area (part of the ventromedial prefrontal cortex)
- Area 26 – Ectosplenial portion of the retrosplenial region of the cerebral cortex
- Area 27 – Presubiculum
- Area 28 – Ventral entorhinal cortex
- Area 29 – Retrosplenial cortex
- Area 30 – Subdivision of retrosplenial cortex
- Area 31 – Dorsal posterior cingulate cortex
- Area 32 – Dorsal anterior cingulate cortex
- Area 33 – Part of anterior cingulate cortex
- Area 34 – Dorsal entorhinal cortex (on the parahippocampal gyrus)
- Area 35 – Part of the perirhinal cortex (in the rhinal sulcus)
- Area 36 – Part of the perirhinal cortex (in the rhinal sulcus)
- Area 37 – Fusiform gyrus
- Area 38 – Temporopolar area (most rostral part of the superior and middle temporal gyri)
- Area 39 – Angular gyrus, considered by some to be part of Wernicke's area
- Area 40 – Supramarginal gyrus considered by some to be part of Wernicke's area
- Areas 41 and 42 – Auditory cortex
- Area 43 – Primary gustatory cortex
- Areas 44 and 45 – Broca's area, includes the opercular part and triangular part of the inferior frontal gyrus
- Area 46 – Dorsolateral prefrontal cortex
- Area 47 – Orbital part of inferior frontal gyrus
- Area 48 – Retrosubicular area (a small part of the medial surface of the temporal lobe)
- Area 49 – Parasubicular area in a rodent
- Area 52 – Parainsular area (at the junction of the temporal lobe and the insula)

(*) Area only found in non-human primates.

Some of the original Brodmann areas have been subdivided further, e.g., "23a" and "23b".

=== Clickable map: lateral surface ===
Note: the lateral view, or side view, of the brain is denoted the 'lateral surface'

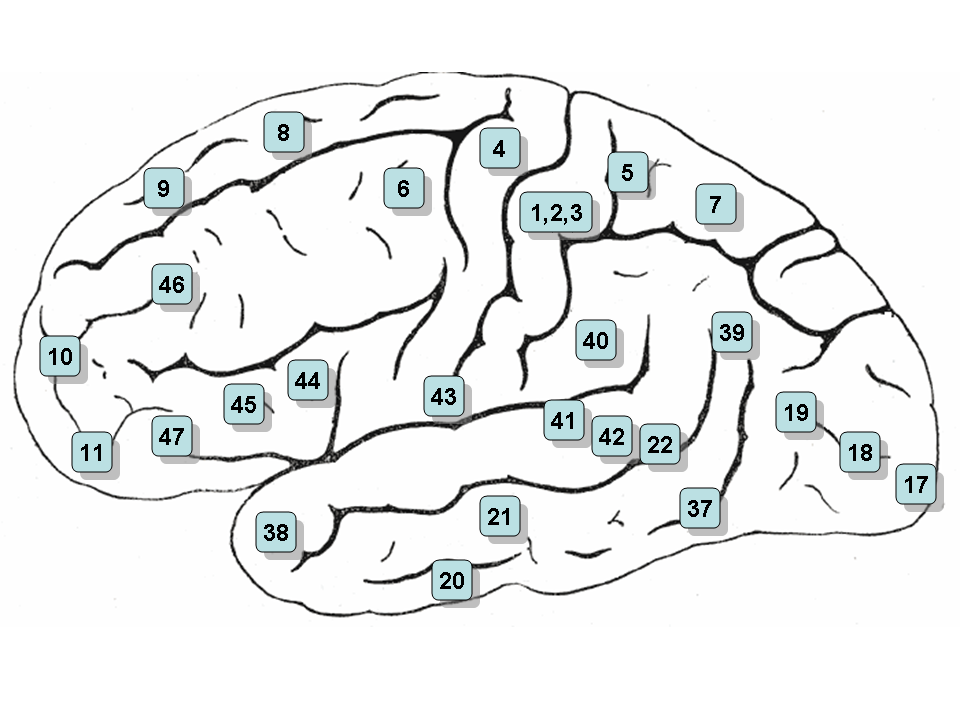
Image mapped Brodmann Areas. Clicking on an area in the picture causes the browser to load the appropriate article.

=== Clickable map: medial surface ===
Note: the view of the section between the right and left hemispheres of the brain is denoted the 'medial surface'

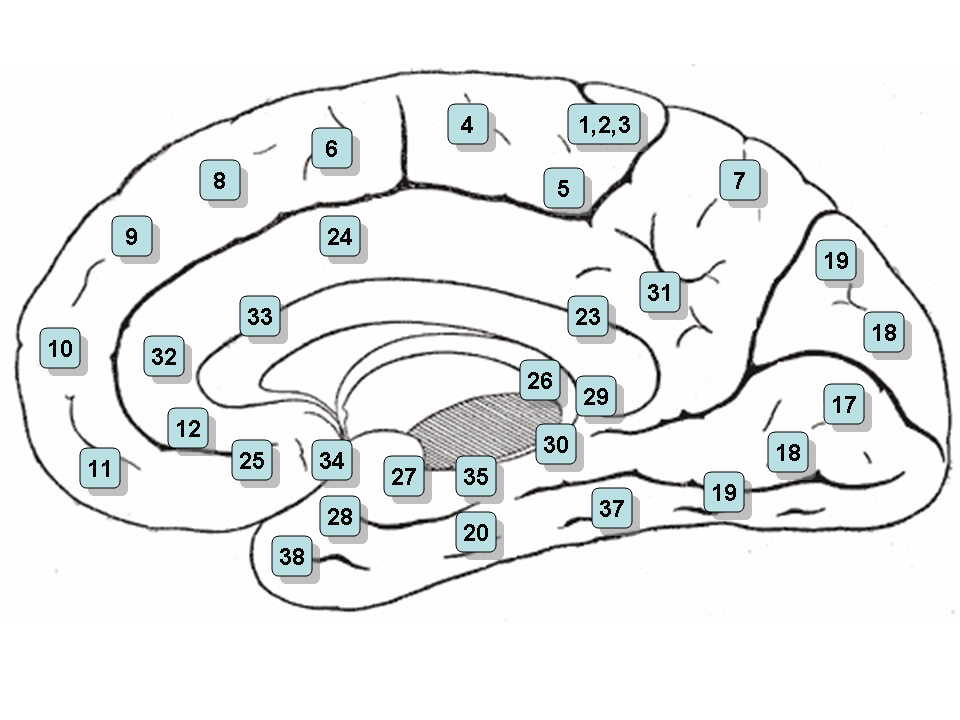
Image mapped Brodmann Areas. Clicking on an area in the picture causes the browser to load the appropriate article.

== Criticism ==
When von Bonin and Bailey constructed a brain map for the macaque monkey, they found the description of Brodmann inadequate and wrote: "Brodmann (1907), it is true, prepared a map of the human brain which has been widely reproduced, but, unfortunately, the data on which it was based was never published" They instead used the cytoarchitectonic scheme of Constantin von Economo and Georg N. Koskinas published in 1925 which, they say, had the "only acceptable detailed description of the human cortex".

== See also ==
- List of regions in the human brain
- Talairach coordinates
