= Brodmann area 48 =

Identifiers
- NeuroLex ID: birnlex_1791
- FMA: 81151

Retrosubicular area 48 is a subdivision of the cytoarchitecturally defined hippocampal region of the cerebral cortex.

In the human brain, it is located on the medial surface of the temporal lobe. Cytoarchitectually it is bounded rostrally by the perirhinal area 35 and medially by the presubiculum. While described by Brodmann (Brodmann-1909), it was not included in his areal maps of human cortex (Brodmann-1909; Brodmann-1910).

== See also ==
- Brodmann area
