= Agranular cortex =

Type of brain cortex with a lack of granular cells

Agranular cortex is a cytoarchitecturally defined term denoting the type of heterotypic cortex that is distinguished by its relative thickness and lack of granule cells. Examples are Brodmann area 30, the agranular insula, and the precentral gyrus, the site of the primary motor cortex. An area of cortex that is only slightly granulated is termed dysgranular.
