= Brodmann area 37 =

Region of the brain's temporal cortex

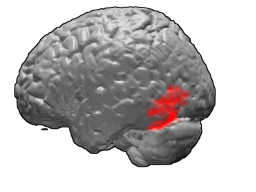

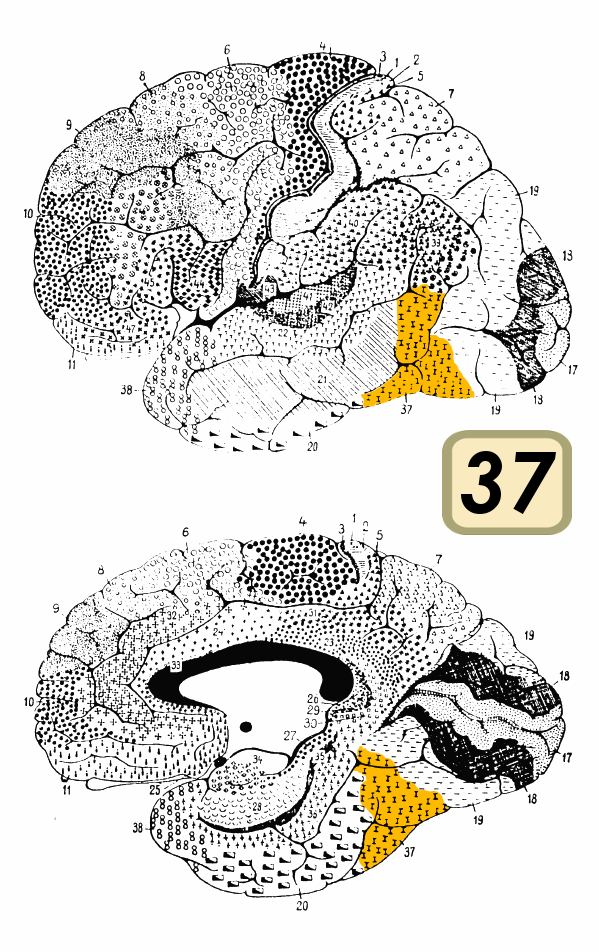

Details

Identifiers
- Latin: area occipitotemporalis
- NeuroLex ID: birnlex_1770
- FMA: 68634

Brodmann area 37, or BA37, is part of the temporal cortex in the human brain. It contains the fusiform gyrus which in turn contains the fusiform face area, an area important for the recognition of faces.

This area is also known as occipitotemporal area 37 (H). It is a subdivision of the cytoarchitecturally defined temporal region of cerebral cortex. It is located primarily in the caudal portions of the fusiform gyrus and inferior temporal gyrus on the mediobasal and lateral surfaces at the caudal extreme of the temporal lobe. Cytoarchitecturally, it is bounded caudally by the peristriate Brodmann area 19, rostrally by the inferior temporal area 20 and middle temporal area 21, and dorsally on the lateral aspect of the hemisphere by the angular area 39 (H) (Brodmann-1909).

== See also ==
- Fusiform face area
- Brodmann area
- List of regions in the human brain
