= Brodmann area 21 =

Area of the temporal cortex

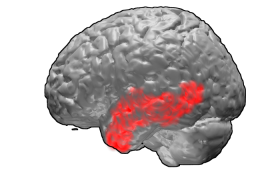

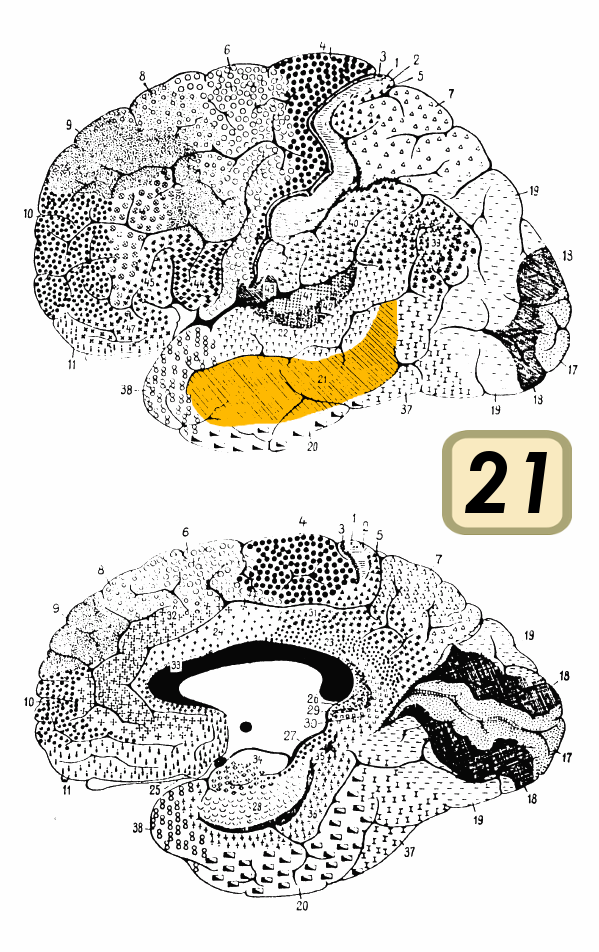

Details

Identifiers
- Latin: area temporalis media
- NeuroNames: 1016
- NeuroLex ID: birnlex_1752
- FMA: 68618

Brodmann area 21, or BA21, is part of the temporal cortex in the human brain. The region encompasses most of the lateral temporal cortex and is also known as middle temporal area 21. In the human it corresponds approximately to the middle temporal gyrus.

== Function ==
BA 21 is a higher-order visual association cortex with medium myelin content. As a lateral temporal region, it is likely to play a part in auditory processing and language. Language function is left lateralized in most individuals.

== Location ==
BA21 is a subdivision of the cytoarchitecturally defined temporal region of the cerebral cortex. BA21 is superior to BA20 and inferior to BA40 and BA41. It is bounded rostrally by the temporopolar area 38 (H), ventrally by the inferior temporal area 20, caudally by the occipitotemporal area 37 (H), and dorsally by the superior temporal area 22 (Brodmann-1909).

== Guenon ==
Brodmann area 21 is a subdivision of the cerebral cortex of the guenon defined on the basis of cytoarchitecture. It is cytoarchitecturally homologous to the middle temporal area 21 of the human (Brodmann-1909). Distinctive features (Brodmann-1905): Compared to area 20 of Brodmann-1909, the total cortical thickness of area 21 is greater, the granular cells are less abundant, and the boundary with the subcortical white matter is less distinct; the molecular layer (I) is wider; the pyramidal cells of sublayer 3b of the external pyramidal layer (III) are larger; the internal granular layer (IV) is less developed and contains fewer cells; ganglion cells of the internal pyramidal layer (V) are larger, rounder, and densely arrayed adjacent to layer IV; the boundary between layer V and the multiform layer (VI) is indistinct; and layer VI is wider and has no sublayers.

== See also ==
- Brodmann area
- List of regions in the human brain
