= Area 20 =

Area 20 may refer to:

- Area 20 (Nevada National Security Site)
- Brodmann area 20, a part of the cerebral cortex in the brain.
