= Perirhinal cortex =

Region of the brain's temporal cortex; receives processed sensory information

Details
- Part of: Cerebral cortex

Identifiers
- Latin: area perirhinalis
- MeSH: D000071039
- NeuroNames: 2425
- NeuroLex ID: nlx_anat_1005006

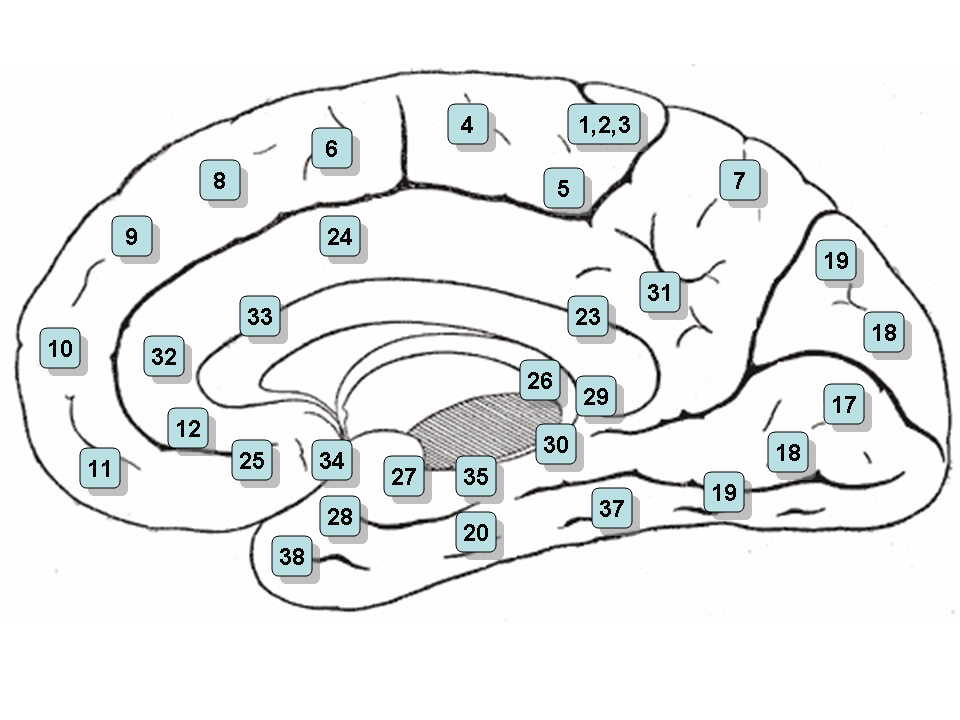
Brodmann areas of a medial section of the right hemisphere.

The perirhinal cortex is a cortical region in the medial temporal lobe that is made up of Brodmann areas 35 and 36. It receives highly processed sensory information from all sensory regions, and is generally accepted to be an important region for memory. It is bordered caudally by postrhinal cortex or parahippocampal cortex (homologous regions in rodents and primates, respectively) and ventrally and medially by entorhinal cortex.

== Structure ==
The perirhinal cortex is composed of two regions: areas 36 and 35. Area 36 is sometimes divided into three subdivisions: 36d is the most rostral and dorsal, 36r ventral and caudal, and 36c the most caudal. Area 35 can be divided in the same manner, into 35d and 35v (for dorsal and ventral, respectively).

Area 36 is six-layered, dysgranular, meaning that its layer IV is relatively sparse. Area 35 is agranular cortex (lacking any cells in layer IV).

== Function ==
The perirhinal cortex is involved in both visual perception and memory; it facilitates the recognition and identification of environmental stimuli. Lesions to the perirhinal cortex in both monkeys and rats lead to the impairment of visual recognition memory, disrupting stimulus-stimulus associations and object-recognition abilities.

The perirhinal cortex is also involved in item memory, especially in coding familiarity or recency of items. Rats with a damaged perirhinal cortex seemed unable to tell novel objects from familiar ones—they were still more interested in exploring when novel objects were present, but examined the novel and familiar objects equally, unlike undamaged rats. Thus, other brain regions are capable of noticing unfamiliarity, but the perirhinal cortex is needed to associate the feeling with a specific source.

The perirhinal cortex also receives a large dopaminergic input and signals the rewards that are associated with visual stimuli

Damage to the perirhinal cortex has been shown to cause impairment in discriminating among object concepts when there is a high degree of visual semantic overlap among choices, such as between a hairdryer and a gun. A growing body of evidence suggests that the perirhinal cortex protects against interference from low-level visual features. The perirhinal cortex's role in the formation and retrieval of stimulus-stimulus associations (and in virtue of its unique anatomical position in the medial temporal lobe) suggest that it is part of a larger semantic system that is crucial for endowing objects with meaning.

== Other animals ==
=== Primates ===
The monkey perirhinal cortex receives a majority of its input from high-level visual areas, whereas, in the rat, its inputs are primarily olfactory and, to a lesser extent, auditory. Outputs to orbitofrontal cortex and medial prefrontal cortex regions (such as prelimbic and infralimbic) have been described. Perirhinal cortex also sends output to a number of subcortical structures, including the basal ganglia, the thalamus, the basal forebrain, and the amygdala.

It also has direct connections with hippocampus region CA1 and the subiculum. Perirhinal cortex projects to distal CA1 pyramidal cells, overlapping the projections from entorhinal cortex. The same CA1 cells send return projections back to perirhinal cortex. Inputs from subiculum terminate in both superficial and deep layers.

Visual areas TE and TEO send and receive a significant reciprocal connection with perirhinal cortex. Weaker, but still significant, projections come from other parahippocampal regions and from the superior temporal sulcus. Other inputs include anterior cingulate and insular regions, in addition to prefrontal projections.

=== Rodents ===
Auditory inputs from temporal cortical regions are the primary inputs to rat 36d, with visual inputs becoming more prominent closer to the postrhinal cortical border. Area 36d projects to 36v and then to 35, which forms the primary output region of perirhinal cortex. Inputs to area 35 more strongly reflect olfactory and gustatory inputs from piriform and insular cortices, in addition to inputs from entorhinal cortex and frontal regions.
