= Area 22 =

Area 22 can refer to:

- Area 22 (Nevada National Security Site)
- Brodmann area 22
