= Brodmann area 43 =

Brain area

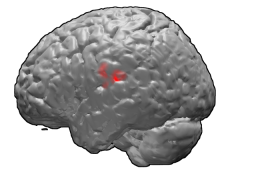

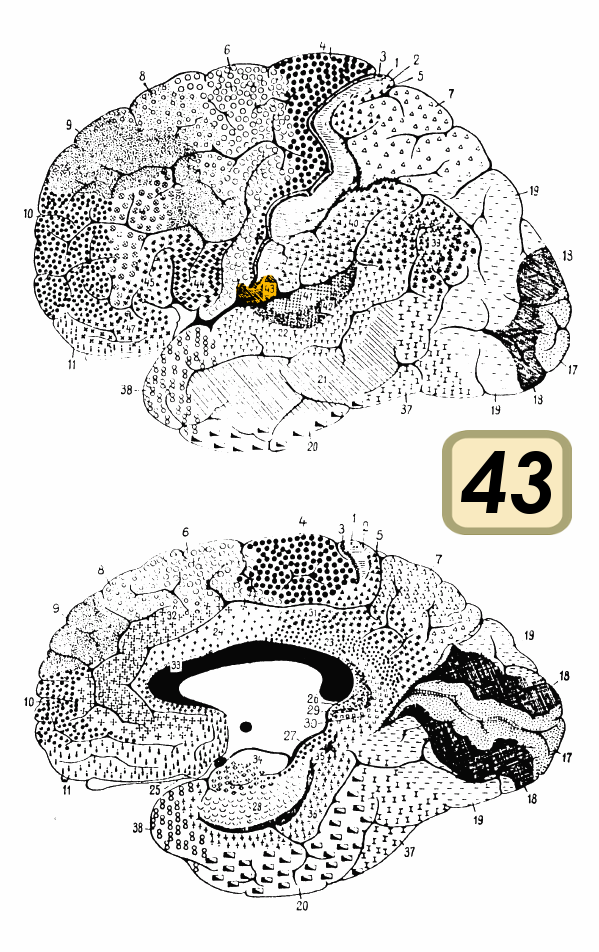

Details

Identifiers
- Latin: area subcentralis
- NeuroNames: 1013
- NeuroLex ID: birnlex_1761
- FMA: 68640

Brodmann area 43, the subcentral area, is a structurally distinct area of the cerebral cortex defined on the basis of cytoarchitecture. Along with Brodmann Area 1, 2, and 3, Brodmann area 43 is a subdivision of the postcentral region of the brain, suggesting a somatosensory ('feeling of the body') function. The histological structure of Area 43 was initially described by Korbinian Brodmann, but it was not labeled on his map of cortical areas.

== Location ==
In the human subcentral area 43, a sub area of the cytoarchitecture is defined in the postcentral region of the cerebral cortex. It occupies the postcentral gyrus, which is between the ventrolateral extreme of the central sulcus and the depth of the lateral sulcus, at the insula. Its rostral and caudal borders are approximated by the anterior subcentral sulcus and the posterior subcentral sulcus, respectively. Cytoarchitecturally, it is bounded rostrally, by the agranular frontal area 6, and caudally, for the most part, by the caudal postcentral area 2 and the supramarginal area 40.

== Function ==
Brodmann Area 43 responds to pressure on the eardrum and to oral intake (eating and drinking). Because eating and drinking change pressure on the middle ear and eardrum, Brodmann Area 43 may be the primary somatosensory cortex of the eardrum. However, Brodmann Area 43 is also reported to respond to tactile stimulation of the fingers.

In a small (n=11 vs n=9 controls) fMRI study in children with obsessive–compulsive disorder the right Brodmann area 43 was found to have increased connectivity.

Additionally, Brodmann Area 43 was found to be functionally active in a study differentiating the roles of the left-frontal and right-cerebellar regions during semantic analysis. Brodmann Area 43 showed a major increase in functional activation by fMRI, when study participants were asked to complete tasks which involved the selection of a verbal response from many possible responses, rather than a sustained search for a verbal response from few possible responses.

== In lower monkeys ==
Brodmann initially believed there to be no distinct Area 43 in his map of the lower monkey, the guenon. However, study of the myeloarchitecture of the region, by Theodor Mauss, determined that monkeys possess a structurally distinct area corresponding to the human subcentral area. It was regarded as cytoarchitecturally homologous to area 30 of Mauss in 1908. However, research by Cécile and Oskar Vogt found no distinctive architectonic area of the corresponding location in the guenon.

== See also ==
- Brodmann area
