= Area 15 =

Area 15 can refer to:

- Area 15 (Nevada National Security Site)
- Area15, a retail and entertainment center in Las Vegas
- Brodmann area 15
- Area15, a unit of Hololive; formerly of Hololive Indonesia
