= Brodmann area 22 =

Region of the brain's temporal lobe

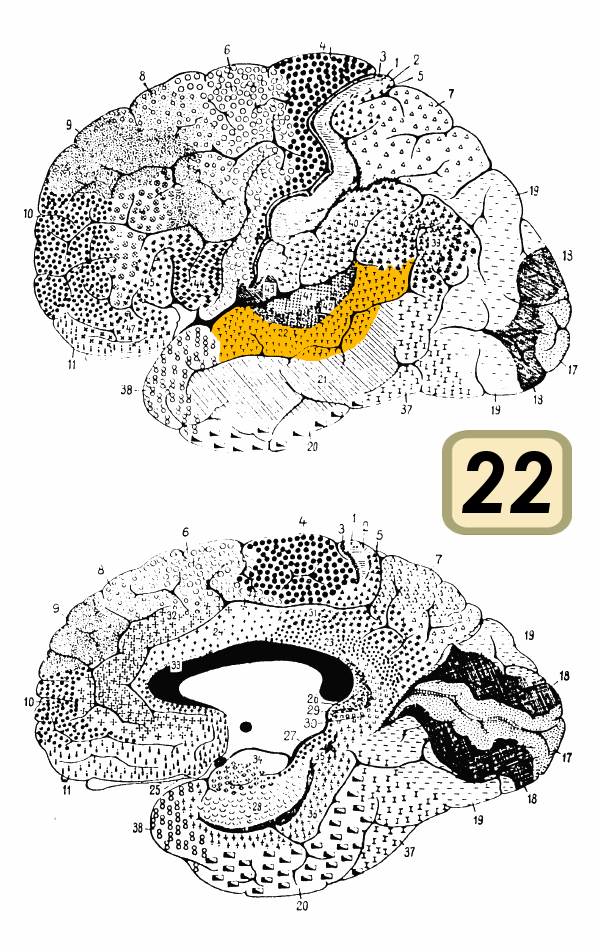
- Brodmann area 22 (orange)

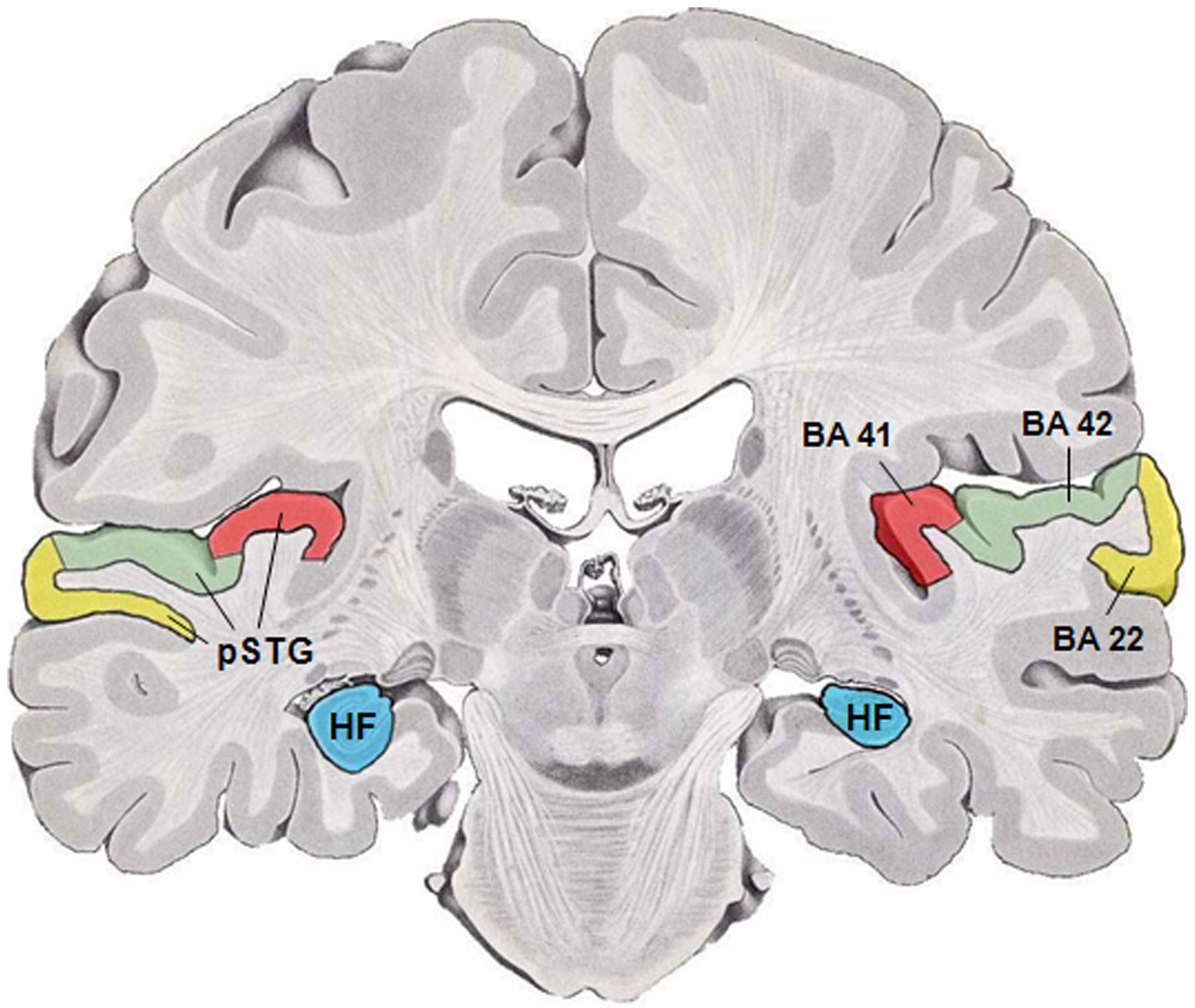
- Coronal section of the human brain. BA22 is shown in yellow.

Identifiers
- NeuroNames: 1017
- NeuroLex ID: birnlex_1753
- FMA: 68619

Brodmann area 22 is a Brodmann's area that is cytoarchitecturally located in the posterior superior temporal gyrus of the brain. In the left cerebral hemisphere, it is one portion of Wernicke's area. The left hemisphere BA22 helps with generation and understanding of individual words. On the right side of the brain, BA22 helps to discriminate pitch and sound intensity, both of which are necessary to perceive melody and prosody. Wernicke's area is active in processing language and consists of the left Brodmann area 22 and Brodmann area 40, the supramarginal gyrus.

It is bounded rostrally by Brodmann area 38, medially by Brodmann area 42, ventrocaudally by Brodmann area 21, and dorsocaudally by Brodmann area 40, and Brodmann area 39. These cortical regions surround the lower left posterior Sylvian fissure.

== Language ==
The Brodmann areas that are relevant to language include Broca's area (BA 44/45) and Wernicke's area (BA 42/22), where Broca's area is responsible for language production and Wernicke's area is responsible for language comprehension.

== Function ==
Brodmann area 22 (BA 22) combined with Brodmann area 42 (BA 42) form Wernicke's area in the superior temporal gyrus in the temporal lobe. Using cytoarchitectonics, BA 22 is located in the superior temporal gyrus which separates it from the primary and secondary auditory cortex. BA 22 is connected with nonverbal sound processing in the right hemisphere of the brain associated with activation in the auditory cortex. More functions associated with language in Brodmann area 22 include producing sentences, semantic processing, and processing of complex sounds. This area of the human brain supports lexical semantic processing and is responsible for language comprehension and production. Wernicke's area is shown to support lexical-semantics because lesions to this area result in difficulties displaying word selection during production of language.

=== Wernicke's Aphasia ===
Because Wernicke's area supports language comprehension in the temporal lobe, lesions to the left auditory cortex, specifically in BA 22, results in Wernicke's aphasia. Wernicke's aphasia, also known as receptive aphasia, is a language disorder characterized as having difficulty comprehending language. This disorder varies in outcomes based on severity and localization of the brain damage, which is most commonly due to having a stroke. Patients diagnosed with Wernicke's aphasia are shown to have normal intonation and rate of speech, however have difficulty understanding different words of a language. Many individuals have poor awareness when making errors in speech, but are typically able to produce normal sentence structures when speaking. These sentences produced by patients with Wernicke's aphasia are often difficult for others to understand because of the problems with word selection and comprehension. These difficulties are shown at a lexical level, for example patients often struggle with naming figures due to accessing words from the lexicon.

== Methodology ==
Methods used to understand functional activity in BA 22 consists mainly of Functional magnetic resonance imaging. Functional magnetic resonance imaging (fMRI) is a neuroimaging technique used to understand how language is processed in the BA 22. Magnetic resonance imaging (MRI) is a technique used to study volume of grey matter and white matter in Brodmann area 22 to find deficits in the structural volume.

=== Parcellations ===
Brodmann areas are based on cytoarchitectonic parcellation using numbering associated with locations in the brain to illustrate functional activity. BA 22 is separated from the primary and secondary auditory cortex by using cytoarchitectonic parcellation. Connectivity-based parcellations in BA 22 can be broken into three subparts: posterior, middle, and anterior subparts of the superior temporal gyrus. Using connectivity-based parcellations involves connections between white fibers to different areas in the brain. Cytoarchitectonic parcellations and connectivity-based parcellations are two ways of breaking the brain down to the structure and the connection fibers of Brodmann Area 22.

== See also ==
- Brodmann area
- List of regions in the human brain

== Gallery ==
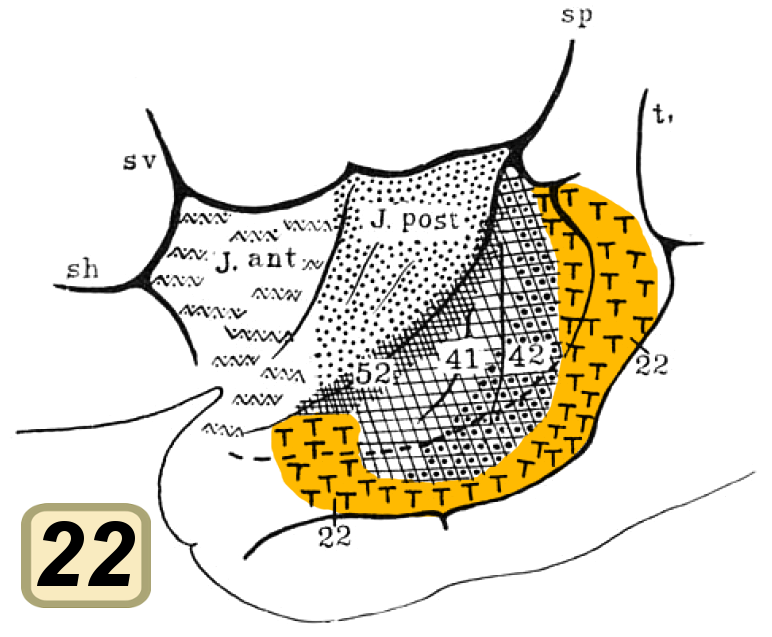
Inside and outside of lateral sulcus. BA22 is shown in orange.
