= BA20 =

BA20 may refer to:

- Brodmann area 20, a part of the temporal cortex in the human brain
- BA-20, an armored car developed in the Soviet Union in 1936
- A postcode district in the BA postcode area
- A type of bayonet mount fastening mechanism
- Band Aid 20
