= Brodmann area 15 =

Identifiers
- NeuroNames: 1010
- NeuroLex ID: birnlex_1746
- FMA: 68612

Brodmann Area 15 is one of Brodmann's subdivisions of the cerebral cortex in the brain.

Area 15 was defined by Brodmann in the guenon monkey, but he found no equivalent structure in humans. However, functional imaging experiments have found structures that may be homologous.

== Anatomy ==
=== Gross Anatomy ===
Area 15 is located in the part of the insula nearest the temporal lobe and part of the anterior temporal lobe facing the insula. It is buried in the Sylvian Fissure and thus not visible on the surface of the brain without dissection.

=== Cytoarchitecture ===
Area 15, like all Brodmann areas, is defined on the basis of cytoarchitecture of the region of cortex. The cortex in area 15 is thinner than in the rest of the insula and temporal lobe. The molecular layer (I) is unusually wide; the external granular layer (II) and the external pyramidal layer (III) are less dense, and the internal granular layer (IV) is totally absent, so that the medium-sized pyramidal cells of layer III and the internal pyramidal layer (V) merge with a few isolated granular cells scattered at their boundary. The multiform layer (VI) divides into a more densely cellular outer sublayer (VIa) and a less dense inner sublayer (VIb). As in Brodmann area 14, the sublayer VIb merges with the adjacent claustrum. The cells in all of layer VI form tangential rows similar to the formation seen in area 10 and area 11.

=== Existence in Humans ===
Brodmann Area 15 is one of the areas that was not found in humans; however, at least one research group has found an area in approximately the correct anatomical location with similar functions.

== Function ==
Area 15 is the cortical target of information coming through Hering's nerves. It therefore receives input from the carotid sinus relaying blood pressure and blood chemistry information to the brain. The nerve gets this information from baroreceptors and chemoreceptors located in the carotid artery. This region has been shown to be active during panic attacks.

== See also ==
- Brodmann area
- List of regions in the human brain
