= Ilya Scheinker =

Russian-born neuropathologist (1902–1954)

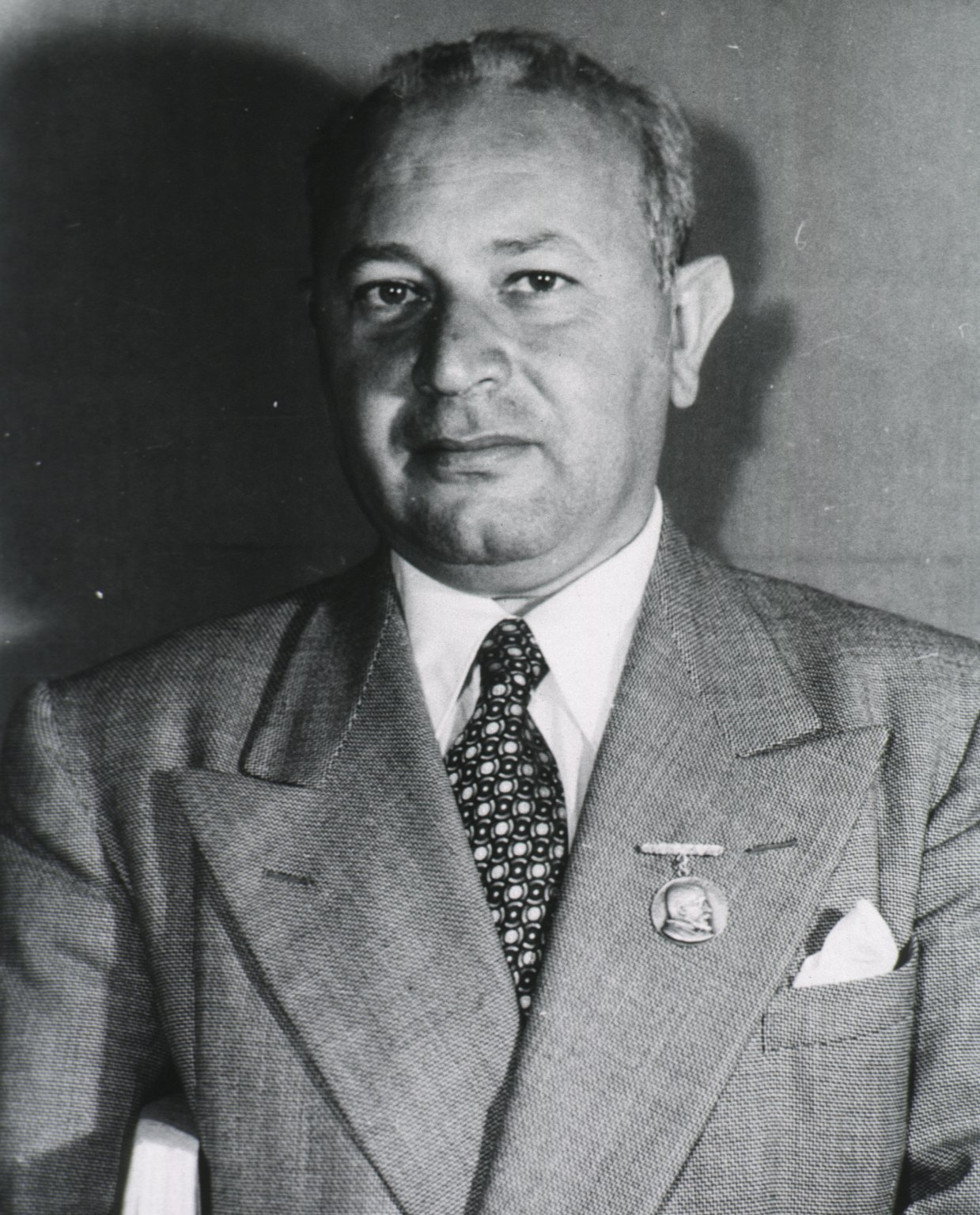
Scheinker c. 1950

Ilya Mark Scheinker (25 June 1902 in Tula – 26 August 1954 in New York City) was a Russian neurologist and neuropathologist who in 1936 collaborated with Josef Gerstmann and Ernst Sträussler to describe Gerstmann–Sträussler–Scheinker syndrome, a variant of Creutzfeldt–Jakob disease.

He studied at the University of Jena, and the University of Vienna, graduating in 1922, authoring several papers regarding multiple sclerosis. After the anschluss, he fled to Paris, working with Georges Guillain at Salpêtrière from 1938, before emigrating to New York in 1941 after the Nazi invasion of France. With assistance from Tracy Putnam, he found work at the Cincinnati General Hospital as head of neuropathology, where he authored several landmark textbooks, before opening a renowned private practice. After suffering a myocardial infarction in 1950, he returned to New York where he was offered a teaching position at New York Medical College, until his death two years later.
