= Ernst Sträussler =

Austrian neuropathologist

Ernst Sträussler (17 June 1872 – 11 July 1959) was an Austrian neuropathologist.

== Biography ==
Ernst Sträussler was born on 17 June 1872 in Uherské Hradiště, Moravia, Austria-Hungary. In 1895, he earned his medical doctorate at the University of Vienna, and afterwards worked at the psychiatric clinic of Julius Wagner-Jauregg (1857–1940). In 1907 he was habilitated for psychiatry and neurology in Prague, where in 1915 he attained the title of professor extraordinary. In 1919, he returned to Vienna.

Sträussler is remembered for his work in forensic psychiatry, as well as his research involving the histopathology of the central nervous system. With neurologist Georg Koskinas (1885–1975) he performed important studies involving malaria inoculations as a type of therapy for progressive general paresis.

In 1936, with neurologists Josef Gerstmann (1887–1969) and Ilya Scheinker (1902–1954), he described a rare prion disease that is usually regarded as a variant of Creutzfeldt–Jakob disease. Today this condition is known as Gerstmann–Sträussler–Scheinker syndrome (GSS).

He died on 11 July 1959 in Vienna.

== Works ==
- Anlage- und Bildungsfehler des Centralnervensystems, Anlagekrankheiten, Missbildungen, Heredodegeneration. Handbuch der Neurolologie des Ohres. Volume 2, 1. Berlin and Vienna, 1928.
- Gerstmann, Josef; Sträussler, Ernst; Scheinker, I. (December 1935). "Über eine eigenartige hereditär- familiäre Erkrankung des Zentralnervensystems". Zeitschrift für die gesamte Neurologie und Psychiatrie (in German). 154 (1): 736–762. doi:10.1007/BF02865827. S2CID 86904496.
