= Brodmann area 39 =

Region of the brain's parietal cortex

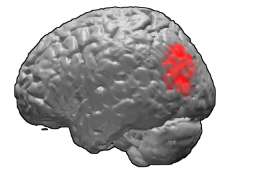

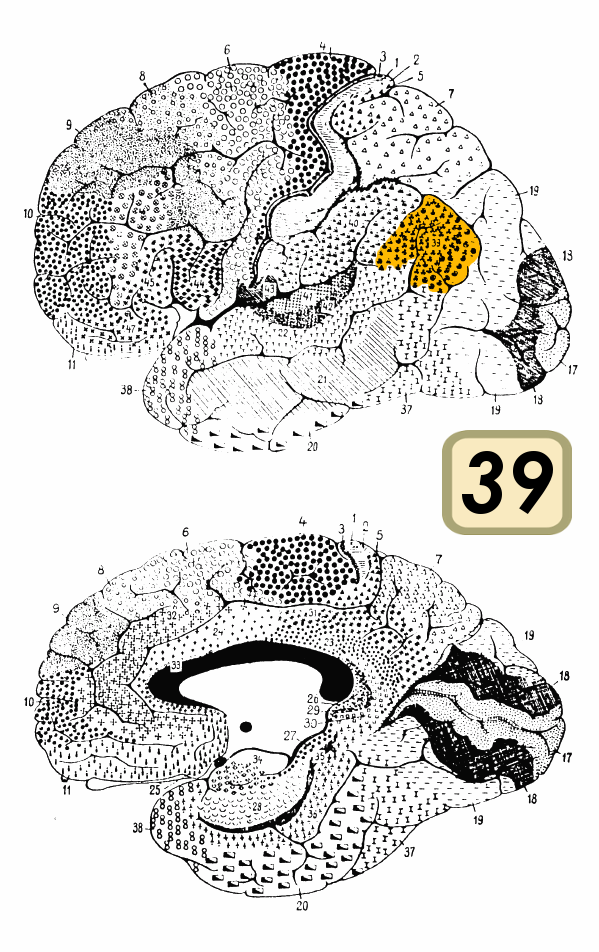

Details

Identifiers
- Latin: area angularis
- NeuroLex ID: birnlex_1772
- FMA: 68636

Brodmann area 39, or BA39, is part of the parietal cortex in the human brain. BA39 encompasses the angular gyrus, lying near to the junction of temporal, occipital and parietal lobes.

This area is also known as angular area 39 (H). It corresponds to the angular gyrus surrounding the caudal tip of the superior temporal sulcus. It is bounded dorsally approximately by the intraparietal sulcus. In terms of its cytoarchitecture, it is bounded rostrally by the supramarginal area 40 (H), dorsally and caudally by the peristriate area 19, and ventrally by the occipitotemporal area 37 (H) (Brodmann-1909).

== Function ==
Area 39 was regarded by Alexander Luria as a part of the parietal-temporal-occipital area, which includes Brodmann area 40, Brodmann area 19, and Brodmann area 37. Damage to the left Brodmann area 39 may result in dyslexia or in semantic aphasia. Albert Einstein had less neurones (relative to glial cells) in this (left sided) area than normal. The right Brodmann area 39 appears to play a role in body image because electrical stimulation of the right angular gyrus induces an 'out-of-body' experience.

== See also ==
- Brodmann area
- List of regions in the human brain
