= Brodmann area 40 =

Part of the parietal cortex in the human brain

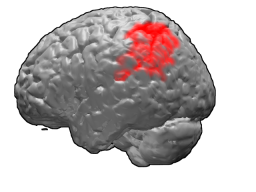
- Brodmann area 40

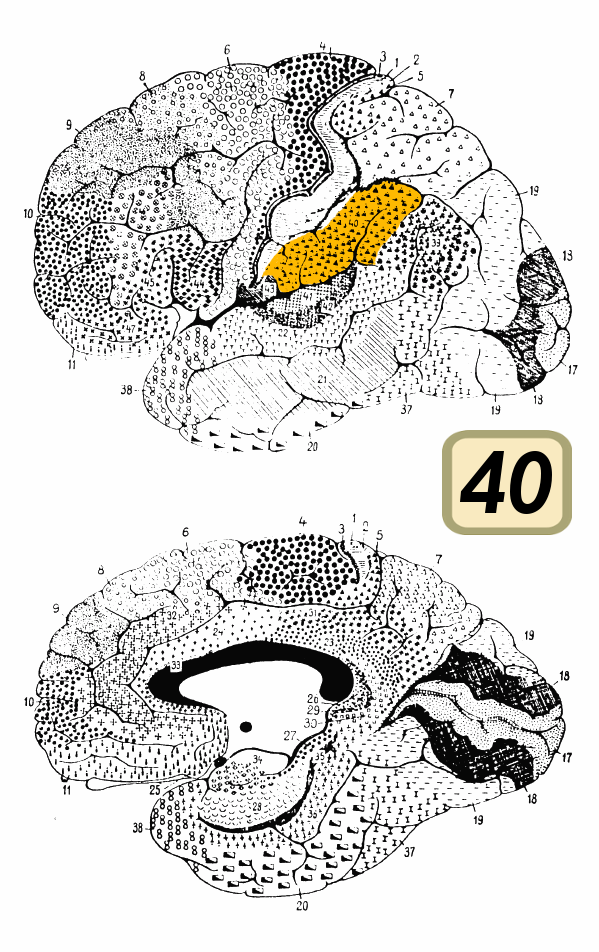

Details

Identifiers
- Latin: area supramarginalis
- NeuroNames: 2408
- NeuroLex ID: birnlex_1773
- FMA: 68637

Brodmann area 40 (BA40) is part of the parietalcortex in the human brain. The inferior part of BA40 is in the area of the supramarginal gyrus, which lies at the posterior end of the lateral fissure, in the inferior lateral part of the parietal lobe.

It is bounded approximately by the intraparietal sulcus, the inferior postcentral sulcus, the posterior subcentral sulcus and the lateral sulcus. It is bounded caudally by the angular area 39 (H), rostrally and dorsally by the caudal postcentral area 2, and ventrally by the subcentral area 43 and the superior temporal area 22 (Brodmann-1909).

Cytoarchitectonically defined subregions of rostral BA40/the supramarginal gyrus are PF, PFcm, PFm, PFop, and PFt. Area PF is the homologue to macaque area PF, part of the mirror neuron system, and active in humans during imitation.

== Function ==
The supramarginal gyrus part of Brodmann area 40 is the region in the inferior parietal lobe that is involved in reading both as regards meaning and phonology.

== Additional images ==
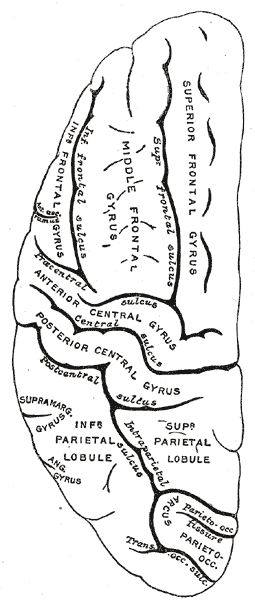
Lateral surface of left cerebral hemisphere, viewed from above.

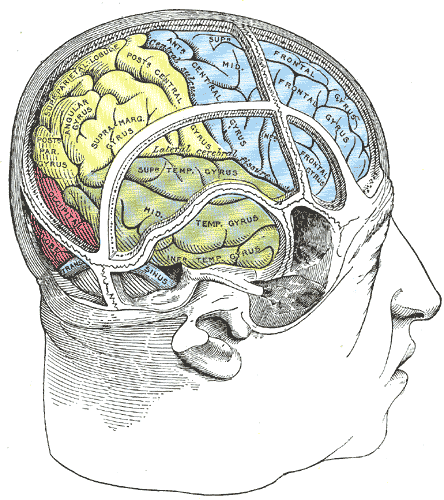
Drawing of a cast to illustrate the relations of the brain to the skull. (Supramarginal gyrus labeled at upper left, in yellow section.)

== See also ==
- parietal operculum
- Brodmann area
- List of regions in the human brain
