= Constantin von Economo =

Austrian psychiatrist and neurologist

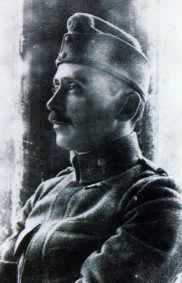
Constantin von Economo

Constantin Freiherr von Economo (Greek: Κωνσταντίνος Οικονόμου; 21 August 1876 – 21 October 1931) was an Austrian psychiatrist and neurologist of Romanian origin. He is mostly known for his discovery of encephalitis lethargica and his atlas of cytoarchitectonics of the cerebral cortex.

== Biography ==
=== Family and schooling ===
Constantin Economo von San Serff was born in Brăila, Romania, to Johannes and Helene Economo, a wealthy family with large holdings in Thessaly and Macedonia. The Economo (Οικονόμου, Oikonomou) family originated from Edessa, in the Ottoman Sanjak of Salonica (modern Edessa, Central Macedonia, Greece) where some of Constantin's ancestors were notables, and his family included many bishops. In 1877, the family moved to Trieste, Austria-Hungary, and Constantin spent his childhood and youth in Trieste. He was a good student, speaking several languages fluently. In 1906, his family was ennobled and Economo obtained the title "Freiherr" (Baron).

At the request of his father, Economo began his study of mechanical engineering at the Polytechnic University of Vienna in 1893 but switched to medicine after two years. His first scientific work, "Zur Entwicklung der Vogelhypophyse" ("On the Development of the Pituitary Gland in Birds") was published in 1899. Economo worked as an assistant for Sigmund Exner from 1900 until 1903. He received his medical degree in 1901.

He married Eleonora (Lola) Glaser, daughter of the Slovene linguist and literary scholar Karol Glaser, and later lady-in-waiting of Queen Maria of Yugoslavia. The two divorced before 1924.

=== Scientific career ===
From 1903 to 1904, he was a resident at the Clinic of Internal Medicine under Carl Wilhelm Hermann Nothnagel. Subsequently, he travelled through Europe for two years and worked for several scientists. He studied neurology, histology, and psychiatry in Paris (under Alexis Joffroy, Valentin Magnan and Pierre Marie). In Nancy, he was introduced to hypnosis (under Hippolyte Bernheim); in Strasbourg he became familiar with methods of microscopic research of the nervous system (under Albrecht von Bethe). In Munich, von Economo worked with Emil Kraepelin and Alois Alzheimer and wrote his article "Contribution to the normal anatomy of the ganglion cell." He also worked in the psychiatry of Berlin under Theodor Ziehen and in the neurologic ambulatory under Hermann Oppenheim and, finally, did experimental animal research in Trieste (under Carl Isidor Cori). After these two years, he returned to Vienna and worked as assistant at the Clinic for Psychiatry and Nervous Diseases (headed by Julius Wagner-Jauregg) at Vienna’s General Hospital. Von Economo obtained his habilitation in 1913. In 1919 at age 43, he married Princess Karoline von Schönburg-Hartenstein. In 1921, von Economo was appointed Professor of Psychiatry and Neurology. He was to conduct his research in the Clinic for Psychiatry and Nervous Diseases in Vienna for the rest of his life, but in 1931, he was made head of a newly established department of brain research. He died five months later.

=== Aeronautics ===
Von Economo was not only an eminent scientist but also a passionate pilot. In 1907, he developed an interest in aeronautics and balloon-flying and became the first Austrian having an international pilot's diploma in 1912. From 1910 until 1926 he was President of the Austrian Aero-Club and chairman of the Aviation Board at the Austrian Ministry of Commerce and Transport. During World War I, he served first in the automobile corps at the Russian front and in 1916 as a pilot at the front in South Tyrol. In the same year, at the request of his parents, he returned to Vienna to care as a military physician for patients with head injuries. Here, he saw his first cases of Encephalitis lethargica.

=== Death ===
In 1931, von Economo died in Vienna, aged 55, of the sequelae of a heart attack. He was honored by an Austrian stamp in 1976. Since 1966, a bust portraying him can be found in the "Arkadenhof" of the University of Vienna.

== Scientific work ==
Economo published about 150 articles and books. In his early studies, he concentrated on the neuroanatomy and physiology of the midbrain, pons and trigeminal nerve pathway and wrote articles dealing for example with choreic hemiplegia, pontine tumors, mastication and deglutition.

=== Encephalitis lethargica ===
This encephalitis with acute inflammation of the grey matter occurred in epidemic form worldwide from 1915 until about 1924, mainly in Europe and North-America, causing lesions in the substantia nigra. Von Economo described in detail the symptoms, pathology and histology of the disease which was soon called Von Economo’s Disease. Three types of this illness could be distinguished. The symptoms of the somnolent-ophthalmoplegic form were somnolence, often leading to coma and death, paralysis of cranial nerves, extremities and eye muscles and expressionless faces. The hyperkinetic form manifested itself with restlessness, motor disturbances as twitching of muscle groups, involuntary movements, anxious mental state and insomnia or inversion of sleep patterns. The amyostatic-akinetic form often led to a chronic state similar to Parkinson's disease, called postencephalitic parkinsonism. The symptoms were weakness of muscles, rigidity of movements and insomnia or sleep inversion.

Von Economo published his findings in an article of 1917, "Die Encephalitis lethargica," and in the monograph "Die Encephalitis lethargica, ihre Nachkrankheiten und ihre Behandlung" in 1929 (Encephalitis lethargica – Its sequelae and treatment). The condition has not occurred since 1940. Von Economo was inspired by this illness to search for a centre of sleep in the brain.

=== Cytoarchitectonic studies ===
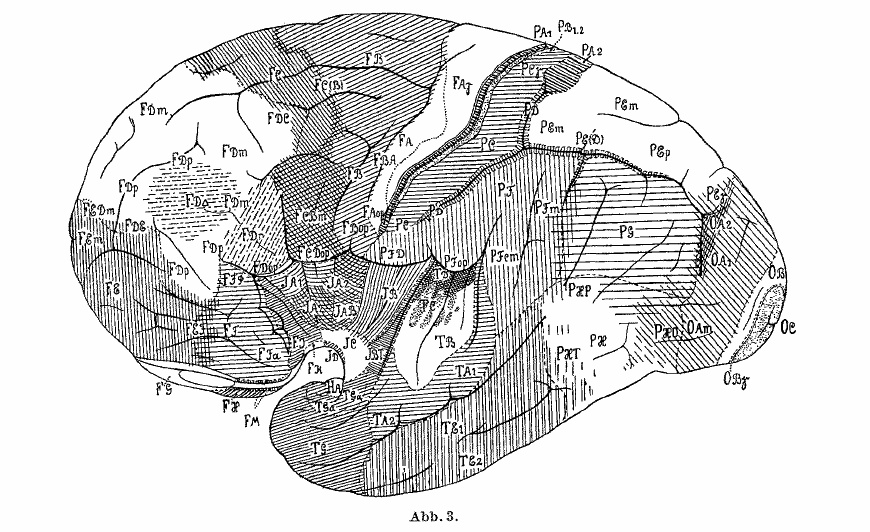
Cytoarchitectonic map from Economo's work

After the first attempts to divide the human cortex into areas according to the cytoarchitecture by Theodor Meynert, Vladimir Betz, Alfred Walter Campbell, Grafton Elliot Smith and Korbinian Brodmann, von Economo started his own project in 1912 and was joined by Georg N. Koskinas in 1919. In 1925, their monumental work "Die Cytoarchitektonik der Hirnrinde des erwachsenen Menschen" ("Cytoarchitectonics of the Adult Human Cerebral Cortex") was published. This work was presented in two volumes, a textbook of more than 800 pages and an atlas with 112 large-sized microphotographic plates of the cortex. The textbook contains detailed descriptions of their studies and an introduction to the history of cytoarchitectonic research. Two years later, a shorter version, "Zellaufbau der Großhirnrinde" ("The Cellular Architecture of the Cerebral Cortex") was published and translated into French, Italian and English. With their atlas, von Economo and Koskinas hoped to create a basis for future brain research and the localisation of brain functions since they assumed that cytoarchitectonic differences reflect functional differences. The atlas was republished in 2008.

Von Economo and Koskinas divided the cortex into seven lobes (Lobi) with further subdivisions (Regiones and Areae):

- Lobus frontalis (F): 35 Areae
  - Regio praerolandica: 10 Areae
  - Regio frontalis: 9 Areae
  - Regio orbitomedialis: 16 Areae
- Lobus limbicus superior (L): 13 Areae
  - Regio limbica superior anterior: 5 Areae
  - Regio limbica superior posterior: 3 Areae
  - Subregio retrosplenialis: 5 Areae
- Lobus insulae (I): 6 Areae
- Lobus parietalis (P): 18 Areae
  - Regio postcentralis: 6 Areae
  - Regio parietalis superior: 4 Areae
  - Regio parietalis inferior: 5 Areae
  - Regio parietalis basalis: 3 Areae
- Lobus occipitalis (O): 7 Areae
- Lobus temporalis (T): 14 Areae
  - Regio supratemporalis: 5 Areae
  - Regio temporalis propria: 2 Areae
  - Regio fusiformis: 3 Areae
  - Regio temporopolaris: 4 Areae
- Lobus limbicus inferior/Lobus hippocampi (H): 14 Areae

=== Von Economo neurons ===
The name "von Economo neurons", or spindle neurons, has been given to large bipolar nerve cells identified by von Economo in layer V of the anterior cingulate and fronto-insular cortex.

=== Progressive cerebration ===
For von Economo, cerebration meant the evolution of the mind through generations, the increase of the brain mass, and the acquisition of new "organs of thought" due to differentiation of cortical areas. In this context, Economo was interested in "élite brains". He hoped to find microstructural characteristics in these brains distinguishing them from "average brains".
