= Heterotypic cortex =

Areas of the neocortex that do not have the typical six-layered structure

Heterotypic cortex consists of those areas of the mature neocortex that deviate markedly from the homogeneous six-layered internal structure seen in the third trimester of human gestation. A few neocortical areas, such as Brodmann area 17 and the granular insular cortex, undergo modification to more than six layers; and in a few areas, such as Brodmann area 4, the number of layers is reduced. Heterotypic cortex is contrasted to homotypic cortex, which retains the fetal six-layered pattern into adulthood. The number of heterotypic areas is small and the specific areas differ somewhat by species.
