= Area 18 =

Area 18 can refer to:

- Area 18 (Nevada National Security Site)
- Brodmann area 18
