= Brodmann areas 35 and 36 =

Regions of the brain's temporal cortex; compose the perirhinal cortex

Brodmann area 35
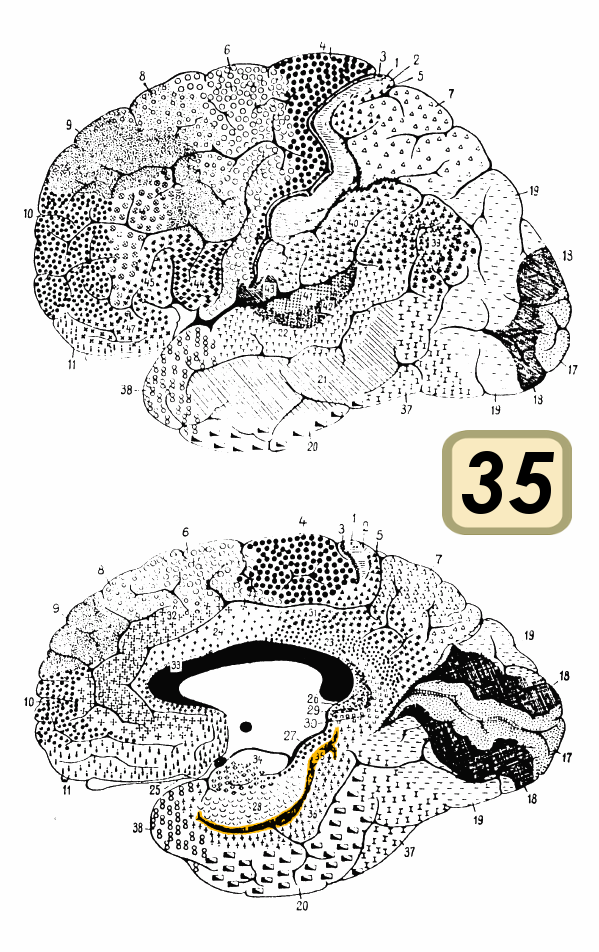

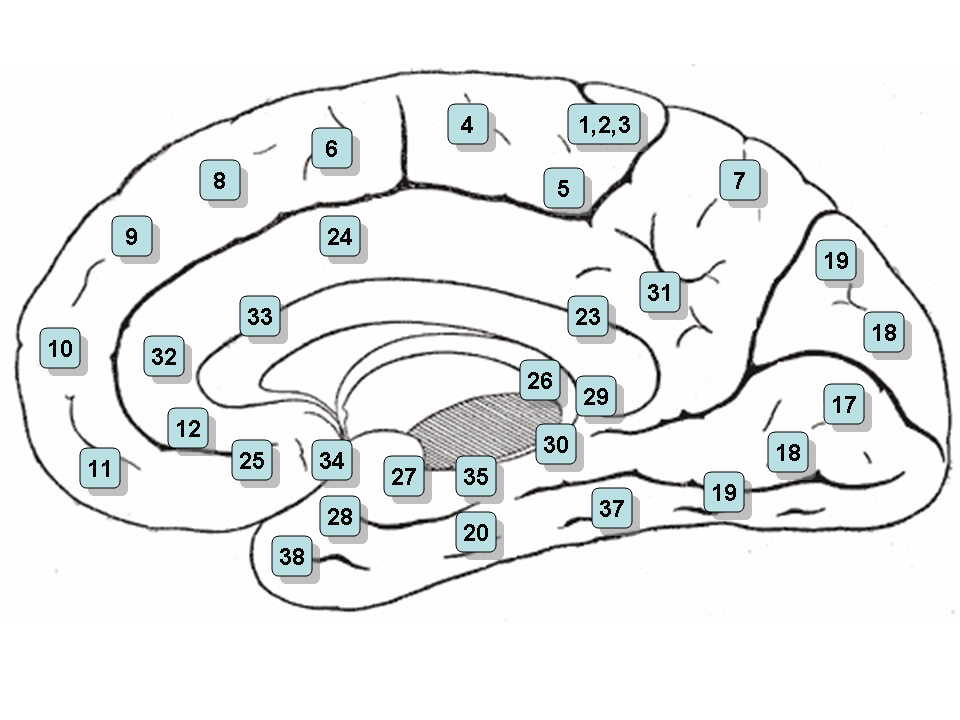
- Medial surface of the brain with Brodmann's areas numbered.

Details

Identifiers
- Latin: area perirhinalis
- NeuroLex ID: birnlex_1768
- FMA: 68632

Brodmann area 36
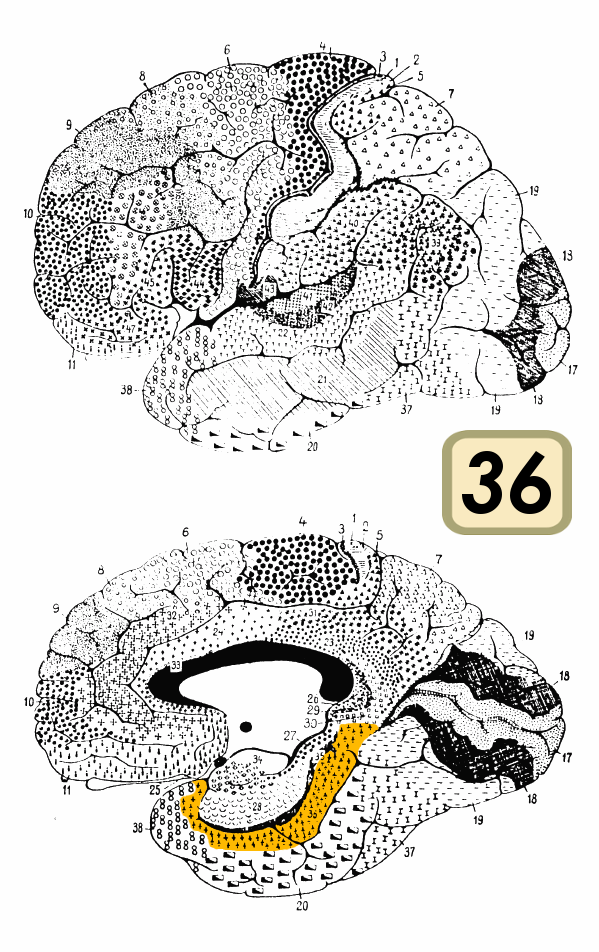

Details

Identifiers
- Latin: area ectorhhinalis
- NeuroLex ID: birnlex_1768
- FMA: 68632

Brodmann area 35, together with Brodmann area 36, comprise the perirhinal cortex. They are cytoarchitecturally defined temporal regions of the cerebral cortex.

== Human Brodmann area 35 ==
This area is known as perirhinal area 35. It is a subdivision of the cytoarchitecturally defined hippocampal region of the cerebral cortex. In the human it is located along the rhinal sulcus. Cytoarchitectually it is bounded medially by the entorhinal area 28 and laterally by the ectorhinal area 36 (H).

== Monkey Brodmann area 35 ==
Brodmann found a cytoarchitecturally homologous area in the monkey (Cercopithecus), but it was so weakly developed that he omitted it from the cortical map of that species (Brodmann-1909).

== Brodmann area 36 ==
With its medial boundary corresponding approximately to the rhinal sulcus it is located primarily in the fusiform gyrus. Cytoarchitecturally it is bounded laterally and caudally by the inferior temporal area 20, medially by the area 35 and rostrally by the temporopolar area 38 (H) (Brodmann-1909). Its function is part of the formation/consolidation and retrieval of declarative/hippocampal memory amongst others for faces. There is also evidence that area 36 may be associated with emotion regulation.

== See also ==
- Brodmann area
