= Middle temporal gyrus =

One of three gyri of the temporal lobe of the brain

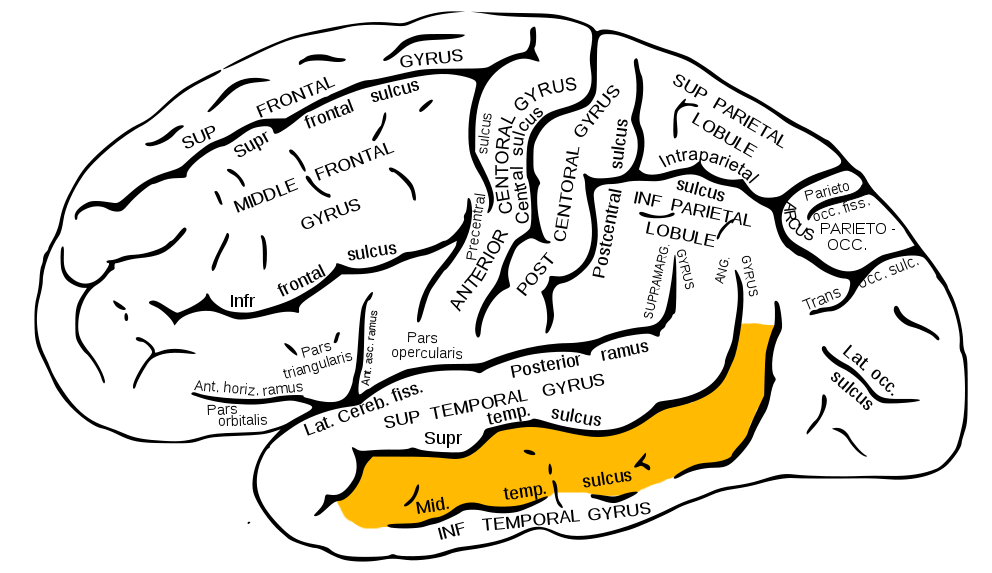
- Lateral surface of left cerebral hemisphere, viewed from the side. (Middle temporal gyrus shown in orange.)

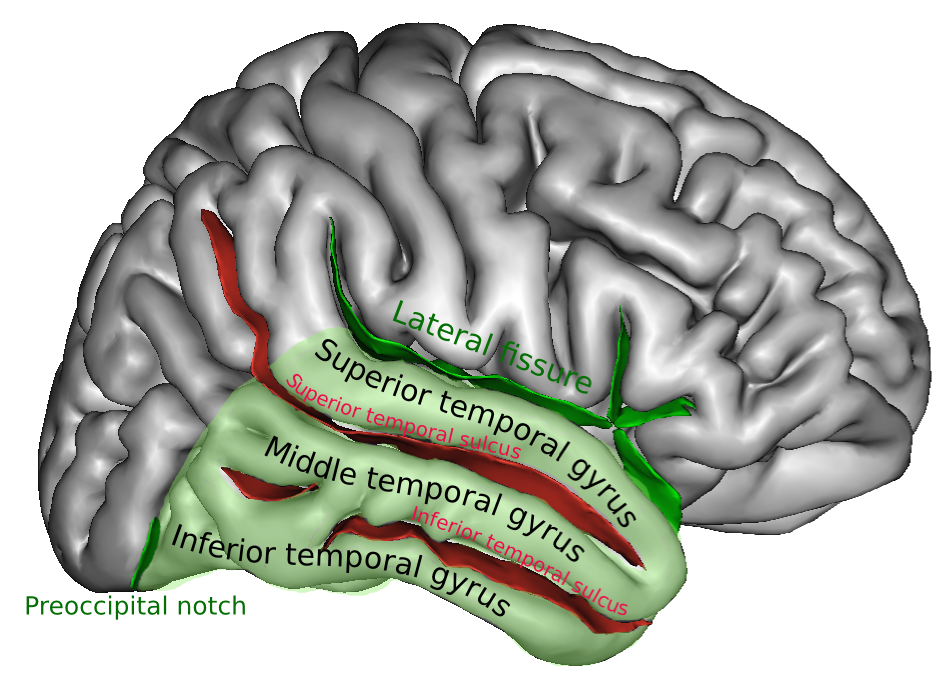
- Right temporal lobe (shown in green). Middle temporal gyrus is visible at the middle of the green area.

Details
- Part of: Temporal lobe
- Artery: Middle cerebral and posterior cerebral

Identifiers
- Latin: gyrus temporalis medius
- NeuroNames: 137
- NeuroLex ID: birnlex_1653
- TA98: A14.1.09.146
- TA2: 5495
- FMA: 61906

Middle temporal gyrus is a gyrus in the brain on the temporal lobe. It is located between the superior temporal gyrus and inferior temporal gyrus. It corresponds largely to Brodmann area 21.

The middle temporal gyrus is bounded by:

- the superior temporal sulcus above;
- the inferior temporal sulcus below;
- an imaginary line drawn from the preoccipital notch to the lateral sulcus posteriorly.

== Function ==
It has been associated with processes as different as contemplating distance, recognition of known faces, audio-visual emotional recognition, and accessing word meaning while reading. Some studies indicate that lesions of the posterior region of the middle temporal gyrus, in the left cerebral hemisphere, may result in alexia and agraphia for kanji characters (characters of Chinese origin used in Japanese writing). The left middle temporal gyrus is also activated during poem composition.

== Additional images ==
Position of middle temporal gyrus(shown in red).

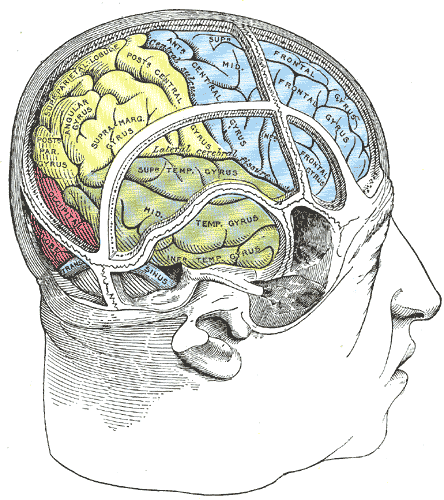
Drawing to illustrate the relations of the brain to the skull.

Lateral view of a human brain, main gyri labeled.

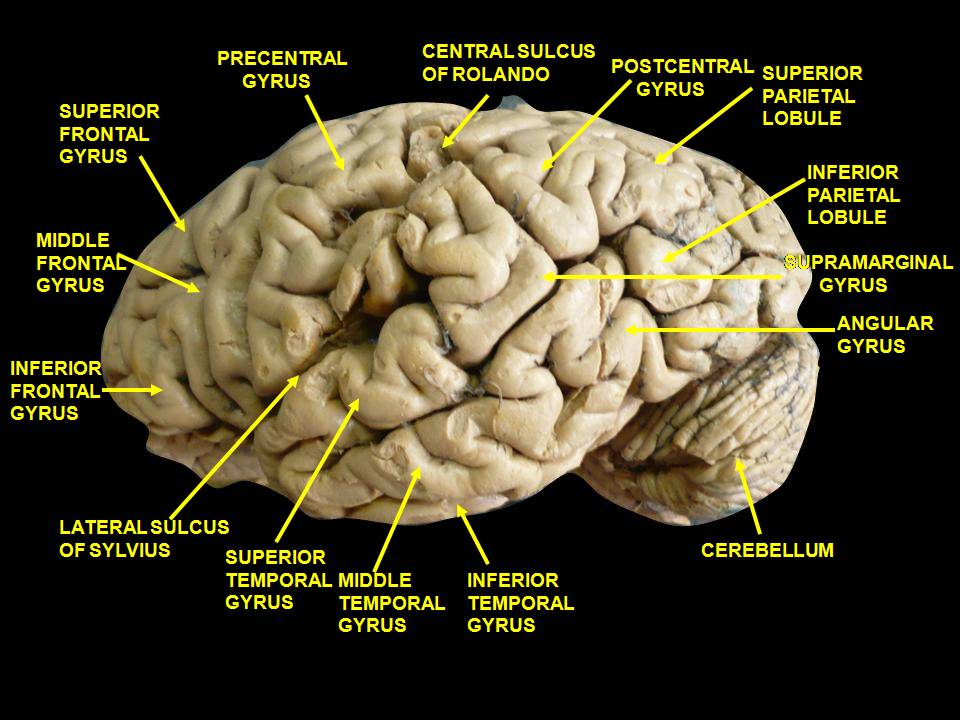
Cerebrum. Lateral view. Deep dissection. Superior temporal gyrus is labeled at bottom center.

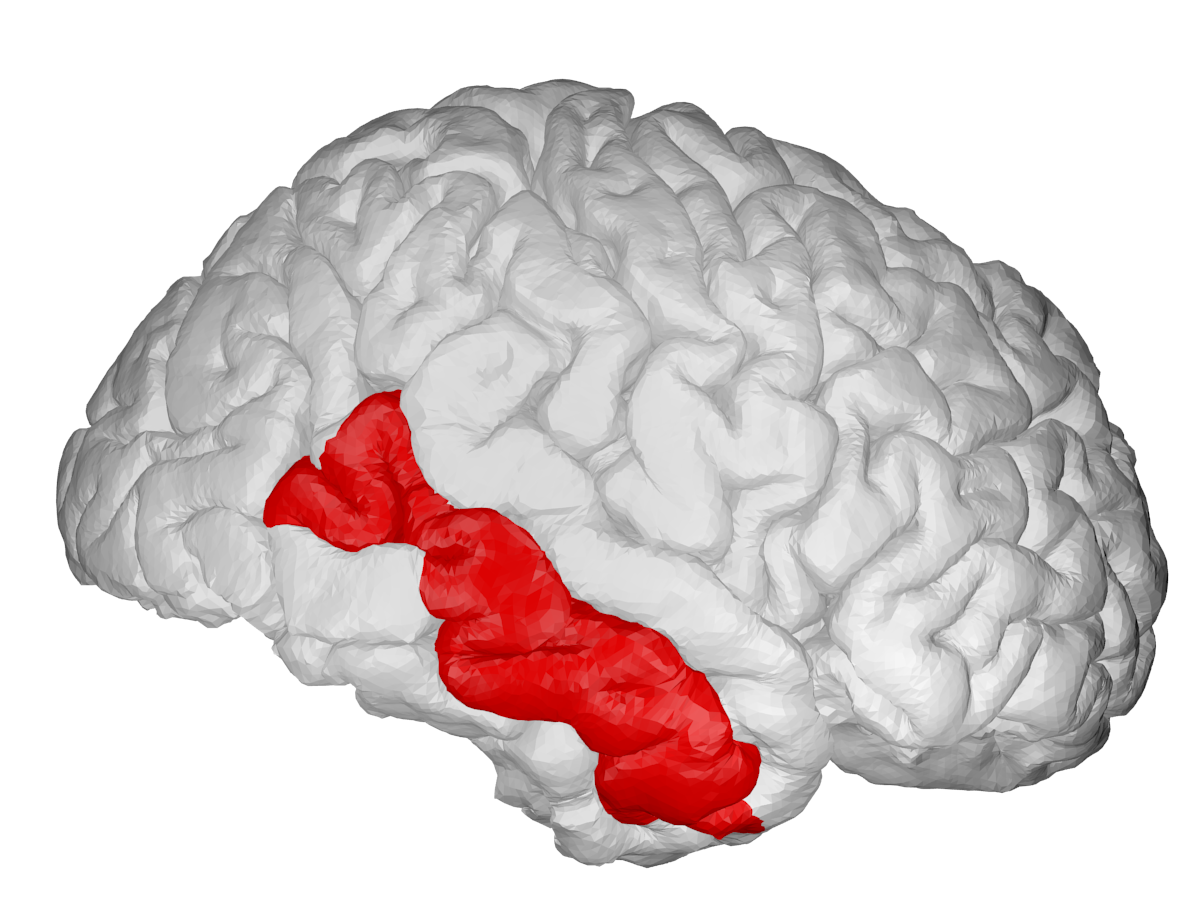
Middle temporal gyrus, right hemisphere.

Middle temporal gyrus highlighted in green on coronal T1 MRI images

Middle temporal gyrus highlighted in green on sagittal T1 MRI images

Middle temporal gyrus highlighted in green on transversal T1 MRI images
