= Preoccipital notch =

Part of the human brain

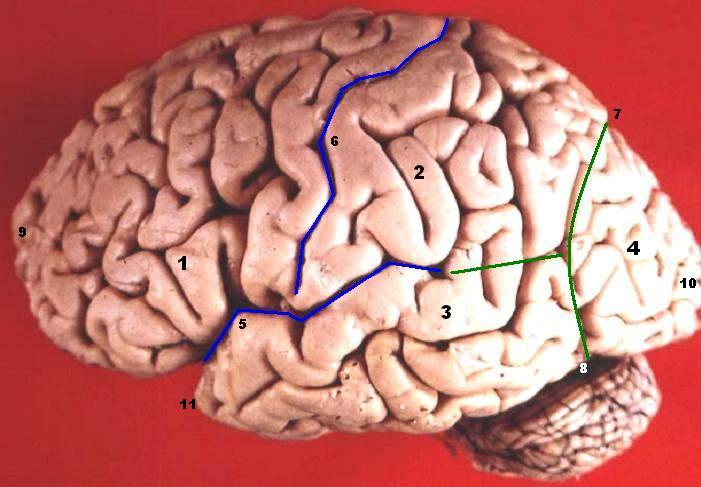
- Human brain lateral view description (#8 at bottom right = incisura praeoccipitalis)

Details

Identifiers
- Latin: Incisura praeoccipitalis
- NeuroLex ID: birnlex_1436
- TA98: A14.1.09.109
- TA2: 5438
- FMA: 83739

About 5 centimetres (2.0 in) in front of the occipital pole of the human brain, on the infero-lateral border is an indentation or notch, named the preoccipital notch. It is considered a landmark because the occipital lobe is located just behind the line that connects that notch with the parietoccipital sulcus.

== Gallery ==
Preoccipital notch (shown in red)
