= Georg N. Koskinas =

Greek neurologist-psychiatrist

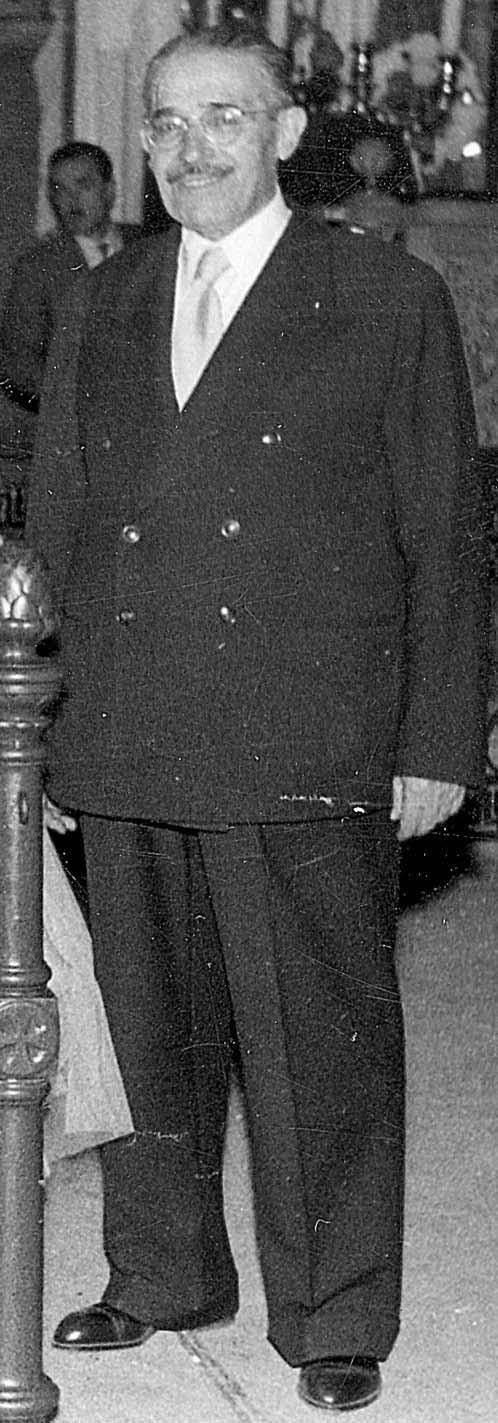
Georg Koskinas

Georg N. Koskinas (1 December 1885 – 8 July 1975) was a Greek neurologist-psychiatrist. He was born on 1 December 1885 in Geraki, near Sparta. He studied medicine at the University of Athens, graduating in 1910, and trained as a resident in the Clinic of Psychiatry and Neurology of Aiginiteion Hospital under Michel Catsaras, a student of Jean-Martin Charcot (1825-1893).

== Life and career ==
Between 1916 and 1927 he worked at the University of Vienna in neuropathology and neuroanatomy. At the Neurological Institute, his mentors in neuropathology were Heinrich Obersteiner (1847-1922) and Otto Marburg (1874-1948). In 1925 Koskinas published, with neurologist Constantin von Economo (1876-1931), the monumental Cytoarchitektonik der Hirnrinde des erwachsenen Menschen (Cytoarchitectonics of the Adult Human Cerebral Cortex).

His collaboration with neuropathologist Ernst Sträussler (1872-1959) in the Psychiatric Clinic headed by Julius Wagner-Jauregg (1857-1940) lead to several histopathological publications related to the malaria therapy of dementia paralytica or general paresis of the insane, a complication of tertiary syphilis.

Following his repatriation to Greece in 1927, he founded private clinics and practised psychiatry and neurology in Kifissia, a northern Athenian suburb.

Koskinas died on 8 July 1975 in Athens at the age of 89.
