= Agranular insula =

Non-neocortical anterior region of the insular cortex

Agranular insula is a portion of the cerebral cortex defined on the basis of internal structure in the human, the macaque, the rat, and the mouse. Classified as allocortex (periallocortex), it is in primates distinguished from adjacent neocortex (proisocortex) by absence of the external granular layer (II) and of the internal granular layer (IV). It occupies the anterior part of the insula, the posterior portion of the orbital gyri and the medial part of the temporal pole. In rodents it is located on the ventrolateral surface of the cortex rostrally, between the piriform area ventrally and the gustatory area or the visceral area (granular insular cortex) dorsally.

== See also ==
- Granular insular cortex
