= Granular insular cortex =

Neocortical posterior region of the insular cortex

Granular insular cortex (or visceral area) refers to a portion of the cerebral cortex defined on the basis of internal structure in the human and macaque, the rat, and the mouse. Classified as neocortex, it is in primates distinguished from adjacent allocortex (periallocortex) by the presence of granular layers – external granular layer (II) and internal granular layer (IV) – and by differentiation of the external pyramidal layer (III) into sublayers. In primates it occupies the posterior part of the insula. In rodents it is located on the lateral surface of the cortex rostrally, dorsal to the gustatory area or, more caudally, dorsal to the agranular insula.

== See also ==
- Agranular insula
