= Korbinian Brodmann =

German neuropsychiatrist (1868–1918)

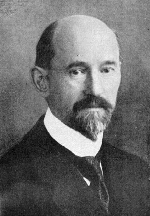
- Korbinian Brodmann
- Born: 17 November 1868; Liggersdorf, Province of Hohenzollern
- Died: 22 August 1918 (aged 49); Munich, Germany
- Occupation: neurologist
- Known for: defining Brodmann areas in the cerebral cortex

Korbinian Brodmann (17 November 1868 – 22 August 1918) was a German neuropsychiatrist who is known for mapping the cerebral cortex and defining 52 distinct regions, known as Brodmann areas, based on their cytoarchitectonic (histological) characteristics.

== Life and career ==
Brodmann was born in Liggersdorf, Province of Hohenzollern, Kingdom of Prussia. He studied medicine at the Ludwig-Maximilians-Universität München, the University of Würzburg, the Friedrich Wilhelm University of Berlin, and the University of Freiburg, where he received his medical diploma in 1895. Subsequently, he studied at the Medical School in the University of Lausanne in Switzerland, and then worked in the LMU Klinikum. He received a doctor of medicine degree from Leipzig University in 1898, with a thesis on chronic ependymal sclerosis. From 1900 to 1901, Brodmann also worked in the Psychiatric Clinic at the University of Jena, with Ludwig Binswanger, and in the Municipal Mental Asylum in Frankfurt. There, he met Alois Alzheimer, who was influential in his decision to pursue basic neuroscience research.

Following this, Brodmann started to work in 1901 with Cécile and Oskar Vogt at the private institute Neurobiologische Zentralstation in Berlin, and in 1902 in the Neurobiological Laboratory of the University of Berlin. In 1915, he joined the Kaiser-Wilhelm-Institut für Hirnforschung, now known as the Max Planck Institute for Brain Research.

In 1909, Brodmann published his original research on cortical cytoarchitectonics in the monograph Vergleichende Lokalisationslehre der Großhirnrinde (Localisation in the cerebral cortex). Famously, this book contained the first map of the cerebral cortex based on regional variations in structure. These regions would later become known as Brodmann areas.

After completing his work in Berlin, Brodmann joined the University of Tübingen. There, he was habilitated and made a full professor in 1913. From 1910 to 1916, he served as physician and chairman of the Anatomical Laboratory at the University Psychiatric Clinic. Brodmann moved to Halle (Saale) in 1916 to work in the Nietleben Municipal Hospital. Finally, in 1918, he accepted an invitation from the Ludwig-Maximilians-Universität München to direct the group of histology at Psychiatric Research Center.

Brodmann died in Munich rather suddenly of a generalized septic infection following pneumonia, at just under 50 years of age on 22 August 1918.

== Brodmann areas ==
Brodmann's diagram of the cerebral cortex with the areas he identified

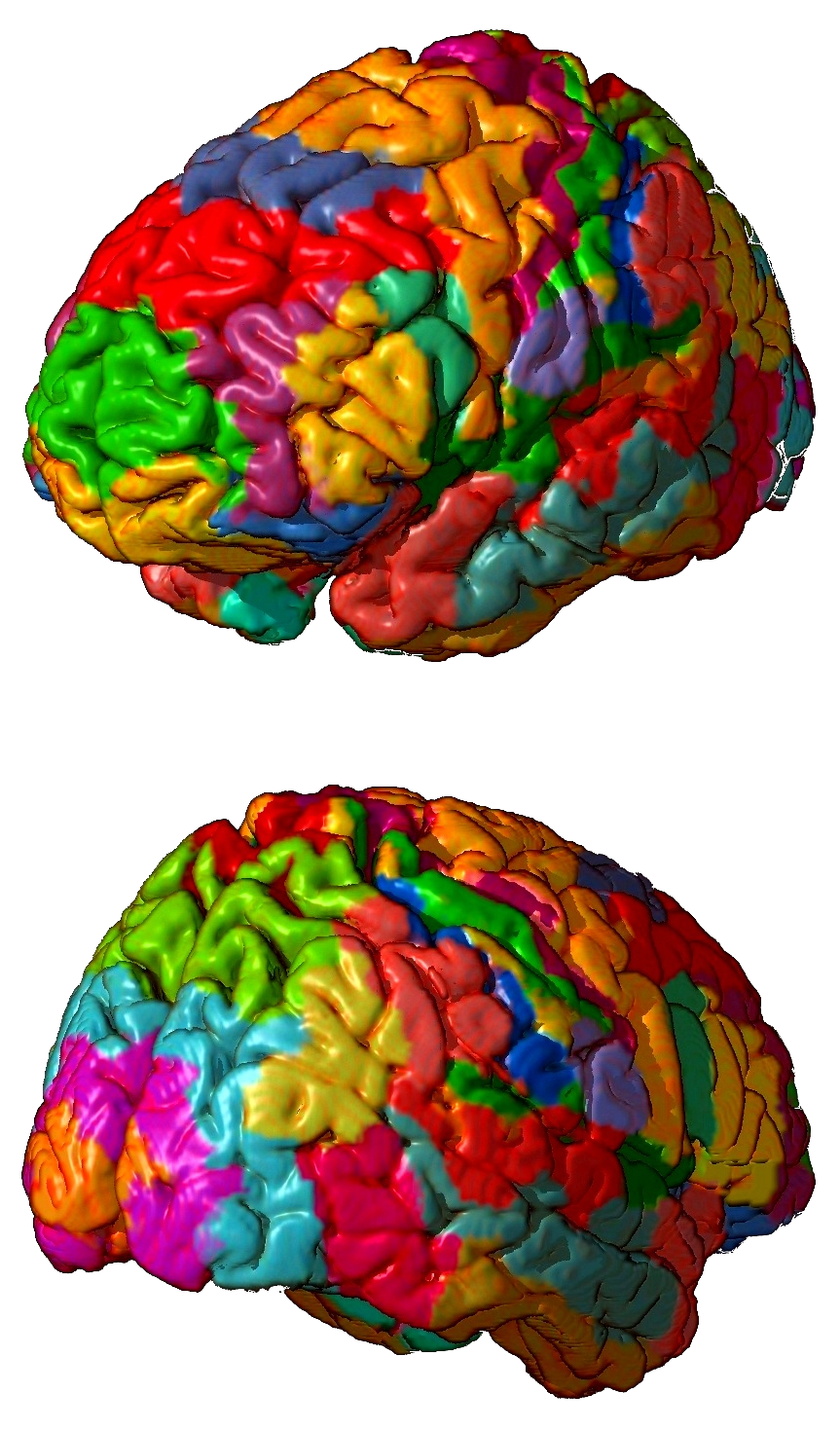
Modern depictions of Brodmann areas

The cortical areas that Brodmann described and located are now usually referred to as Brodmann areas. There are a total of 52 areas grouped into 11 histological areas. Brodmann used a variety of criteria to map the human brain, including attention to both gross anatomical features and cortical microstructures. Brodmann postulated that areas with different structures performed different functions. Indeed, some of these areas were later associated to nervous functions, such as the following:

- Brodmann area 41 and 42 in the temporal lobe, related to hearing
- Brodmann area 45 and 44 overlap with the Broca's area for language in humans
- Brodmann area 1, 2, and 3 in the postcentral gyrus of the parietal lobe (the somatosensory region)
- Brodmann area 4 in the precentral gyrus of the frontal lobe (the primary motor area)
- Brodmann area 17 and 18 in the occipital lobe (the primary visual areas).

His work to characterize brain cytoarchitecture was strongly influenced by Oskar Vogt, who postulated over 200 distinct areas in the brain. In modern science, the regions that were identified by Brodmann are frequently referred to by their function, rather than by the number Brodmann assigned to them. However, in some situations, the use of Brodmann numbers persists.
