= Cytoarchitecture =

Microscopic study of the anatomy of human nervous tissue

The human cerebral cortex divided into Brodmann areas on the basis of cytoarchitecture.

Cytoarchitecture (from Greek κύτος 'cell' and ἀρχιτεκτονική 'architecture'), also known as cytoarchitectonics, is the study of the cellular composition of the central nervous system's tissues under the microscope. Cytoarchitectonics is one of the ways to parse the brain, by obtaining sections of the brain using a microtome and staining them with chemical agents which reveal where different neurons are located.

The study of the parcellation of nerve fibers (primarily axons) into layers forms the subject of myeloarchitectonics (from Greek μυελός 'marrow' and ἀρχιτεκτονική 'architecture'), an approach complementary to cytoarchitectonics.

== History of the cerebral cytoarchitecture ==
Defining cerebral cytoarchitecture began with the advent of histology—the science of slicing and staining brain slices for examination. It is credited to the Viennese psychiatrist Theodor Meynert (1833–1892), who in 1867 noticed regional variations in the histological structure of different parts of the gray matter in the cerebral hemispheres.

Paul Flechsig was the first to present the cytoarchitecture of the human brain into 40 areas. Alfred Walter Campbell then divided it into 14 areas.

Sir Grafton Elliot Smith (1871–1937), a New South Wales native working in Cairo, identified 50 areas. Korbinian Brodmann worked on the brains of diverse mammalian species and developed a division of the cerebral cortex into 52 discrete areas (of which 44 in the human, and the remaining 8 in the non-human primate brain). Brodmann used numbers to categorize the different architectural areas, now referred to as a Brodmann Area, and he believed that each of these regions served a unique functional purpose.

Constantin von Economo and Georg N. Koskinas, two neurologists in Vienna, produced a landmark work in brain research by defining 107 cortical areas on the basis of cytoarchitectonic criteria. They used letters to categorize the architecture, e.g., "F" for areas of the frontal lobe.

== The Nissl staining technique ==
The Nissl staining technique (named for Franz Nissl the neuroscientist and histologist who originated the technique) is commonly used for determining the cytoarchitectonics of neuroanatomical structures, using common agents such as thionine, cresyl violet, or neutral red. These dyes intensely stain "Nissl bodies" (rough endoplasmic reticulum), which are abundant in neurons and reveal specific patterns of cytoarchitecture in the brain. Other common staining techniques used by histologists in other tissues (such as the hematoxylin and eosin or "H&E stain") leave brain tissue appearing largely homogeneous and do not reveal the level of organization apparent in a Nissl stain. Nissl staining reveals details ranging from the macroscopic, such as the laminar pattern of the cerebral cortex or the interlocking nuclear patterns of the diencephalon and brainstem, to the microscopic, such as the distinctions between individual neurons and glia in any subregion of the central nervous system. Many other neuroanatomic and cytoarchitectonic techniques are available to supplement Nissl cytoarchitectonics, including immunohistochemistry and in situ hybridization, which allow one to label any gene or protein expressed in any group of cells in the brain. However, Nissl cytoarchitecture remains a reliable, inexpensive, and familiar starting or reference point for neuroscientists wishing to examine or communicate their findings in a widely recognized anatomical framework and/or in reference to neuroanatomical atlases which use the same technique.

== See also ==
- Otfrid Foerster
