= Biology of obsessive–compulsive disorder =

Biologically based theories about the mechanism of obsessive–compulsive disorder

The biology of obsessive–compulsive disorder (OCD) refers to biologically based theories about the mechanism of OCD. Cognitive models generally fall into the category of executive dysfunction or modulatory control. Neuroanatomically, functional and structural neuroimaging studies implicate the prefrontal cortex (PFC), basal ganglia (BG), insula, and posterior cingulate cortex (PCC). Genetic and neurochemical studies implicate glutamate and monoamine neurotransmitters, especially serotonin and dopamine.

== Neuroanatomy ==
=== Models ===
The cortico-basal ganglia-thalamo-cortical loop (CBGTC) model is based on the observation that the basal ganglia loops related to the orbitofrontal cortex (OFC) and anterior cingulate cortex (ACC) are implicated in OCD by neuroimaging studies, although the directionality of volumetric and functional changes is not consistent. Causal evidence from OCD secondary to neuropsychiatric disorders supports the CBGTC model. Obsessions may arise from failure of the circuit to gate information that is normally implicitly processed, leading to representation in explicit processing systems such as the dlPFC and hippocampus, and thereby resulting in obsessions.

Abnormal affect in OCD has been hypothesized to result from dysfunction in the OFC, ventral striatum, and amygdala. OCD is characterized by high levels of anxiety, high rates of comorbidity with major depressive disorder, and blunted response to reward. This is reflected by reduced amygdala and ventral striatum response to positive stimuli, and elevated amygdala response to fearful stimuli. Furthermore, deep brain stimulation of the nucleus accumbens is an effective treatment of OCD, and symptom improvement correlates with reduced binding of dopamine receptors. The reduced binding, due to the ability of the radioligand tracers to be displaced by endogenous dopamine, is taken to reflect increased basal dopamine release. Affective dysregulation due to blunted reward, and elevated fear sensitivity may promote compulsivity by assigning excessive motivational salience to avoidance behavior.

The ventral striatum is important in action selection, and receives inputs from the medial OFC that signal various aspects of value for stimulus association outcomes. By assigning abnormal values to certain behaviors, OFC may lead to compulsive behavior through modulating action selection in the ventral striatum. A number of abnormalities have been found in the OFC, including reduced volume, increased resting state activity, and reduced activity during cognitive tasks. The difference between resting and cognitive paradigms may be due to increased signal to noise ratio, a possible mechanism of aberrant valuation. OFC-striatum connectivity also predicts symptom severity, although the opposite has been found in some studies.

Besides abnormal valuation of stimuli or tasks, compulsions may be driven by dysfunction in error monitoring that leads to excessive uncertainty.

OCD has also been conceptualized as resulting from dysfunction in response inhibition, and fear extinction. While hyperactivation of the OFC as a whole during resting is observed in OCD, hyperactivation of the lateral OFC (lOFC) and hypoactivation of the medial OFC (mOFC) is seen. This is congruent with the localization of fear/avoidance behaviors to the lOFC and emotional regulation to the mOFC. Hyperactivity of the dorsal ACC during monitoring tasks, along with hyperactivity of the lOFC and amygdala, may all contribute to generating obsessions; reduced regulation by the mOFC may enable them.

One model suggests that obsessions do not drive compulsions, but are rather byproducts of compulsions, as evidenced by some studies reporting excessive reliance on habit. Dysfunctional habit based learning may be a driver behind neuroimaging studies of memory reporting increased hippocampus activity. The conscious processing of information that is normally implicitly processed may be the underlying cause of obsessions.

There is a hypothesis, supported by experimental data, that the pathology of OCD is explained by two factors: hyperactivation of the error detector (in particular a population of neurons in the ACC) and insufficient activity of the inhibitory control mechanism (in particular, if this is an automatic unconscious mechanism, a number of subcortical structures, including the striatum, synchronized with the right inferior frontal gyrus (rIFG), and if this is a conscious higher mechanism, then the dorsolateral prefrontal cortex (dlPFC)). The automatic latter factor is associated with hyperactivation of the “direct” pathway (responsible for the emergence of automatic reactions) and hypoactivation of the “indirect” (responsible for the inhibition of automatic reactions) CBGTC pathway. OCD patients demonstrated a decrease in reaction in the Go/No-Go tests, which is associated with the dissociation of the CBGTC links under conditions of contextual uncertainty. Also, OCD patients were found to have hyperactivation of the ACC at the initial stages of OCD and a decrease in the ACC activation with increasing duration and progression of the disease in the resting state compared to the group of healthy subjects, and a reduced increase in the ACC activity compared to the resting state was found under task performance in the Go/No-Go tests. Thus, in OCD patients, the ACC activity increases with increasing duration of the disease when performing simple tasks, but, on the contrary, decreases when performing complex tasks. These data may indicate a general hyperactivation of the ACC in OCD patients, but with increasing duration of the disease, depletion of neuronal populations in this area of the brain occurs, as a result of which the functions of the ACC are taken over by other brain structures, and these data may also explain conflicting experimental data on hyperactivity and hypoactivity of the ACC and the salience network (SN) in different studies. Excessive activation of the ACC and the error detector in general leads to a sensation in patients that forces them to unconsciously search for a reason for anxiety (obsessions unconsciously assessed as "important" at the moment and determined, as a rule, from the assessment of individual significance in the anterior insula (AI)) and to search for irrationally "effective" ways to resolve the imaginary conflict (compulsions selected by the OFC as a strategy for dealing with uncertainty and based on individual experience and evolutionarily embedded schemas; this selection process may explain the hyperactivity of the OFC). Obsessions and compulsions become more automatic over time due to the dopamine reinforcement mechanism. In terms of Daniel Wegner's ironic process theory, hyperactivation of the error control system may indicate the predominance of the monitoring process, while hypoactivation of the inhibitory control system, further explicit representation of the hyperactivated high-amplitude ensemble of neurons in the sensory cortex (specific obsessive thought) and the impossibility of its conscious suppression by the dlPFC (an obvious manifestation of obsession) may indicate the ineffectiveness of the operational process. The dlPFC, in turn, is insufficiently active (the operational process is ineffective) and cannot consciously suppress thoughts due to the depletion of resources captured by the hyperactive error detector system.

=== Autoimmunity and Anti Basal Ganglia Antibodies ===
Antibasal ganglia antibodies (ABGA) are autoantibodies that react with antigens associated with the basal ganglia. Autoimmune-mediated basal ganglia dysfunction has been implicated in neuropsychiatric disorders involving obsessive–compulsive symptoms. Antibasal ganglia antibodies work by destroying healthy nerve cells by mistake. Its potential involvement in primary obsessive–compulsive disorder (OCD) has also been investigated.

A systematic review and meta-analysis of seven case-control studies involving 844 participants found that individuals with primary OCD had significantly higher odds of serum ABGA positivity than control groups (odds ratio 4.97, 95% CI 2.88–8.55). This association remained significant across analyses stratified by age, sex, illness severity and duration, laboratory methodology, and the characteristics of the study. However, ABGA positivity did not differ significantly between individuals with other mental health issues like Tourette syndrome, ADHD, or paediatric acute-onset neuropsychiatric syndrome. One study included in the review also reported higher odds of ABGA positivity in cerebrospinal fluid among individuals with OCD compared with healthy controls (odds ratio 5.60, 95% CI 1.04–30.20). (Pearlman DM, Vora HS, Marquis BG, Najjar S, Dudley LA. Anti-basal ganglia antibodies in primary obsessive-compulsive disorder: systematic review and meta-analysis.

These findings provide some evidence of an autoimmune component in a subset of individuals with OCD. However, this is not reason enough to conclude that this is a direct cause of OCD, and the relationship must be studied further.

=== Functional neuroimaging ===
Functional neuroimaging studies have implicated multiple regions in OCD. Symptom provocation is associated with increased likelihood of activation in the bilateral orbitofrontal cortex (OFC), right anterior PFC, left dorsolateral prefrontal cortex (dlPFC), bilateral anterior cingulate cortex (ACC), left precuneus, right premotor cortex, left superior temporal gyrus (STG), bilateral external globus pallidus, left hippocampus, right insula, left caudate, right posterior cingulate cortex (PCC), and right superior parietal lobule. The medial portion of the orbitofrontal cortex connects with the paralimbic-limbic system, including the insular cortex, cingulate gyrus, amygdala, and hypothalamus. This area is involved in encoding the representation of the value of an expected outcome, which is used to anticipate positive and negative consequences that are likely to follow a given action. Hyperactivation during affective tasks has been observed in the ACC, insula, head of the caudate, and putamen, regions implicated in salience, arousal, and habit. Hypoactivation during affective tasks is observed in the medial prefrontal cortex (mPFC) and posterior caudate, which are implicated in behavioral and cognitive control. During non-affective tasks, hyperactivation has been observed in the precuneus and PCC, while hypoactivation has been observed in the pallidum, ventral anterior thalamus and posterior caudate. An older meta analysis found hyperactivity in the OFC and ACC. An ALE meta analysis of various functional neuroimaging paradigms observed various abnormalities during Go/no go, interference, and task switching paradigms. Decreased likelihood of activation in right putamen and cerebellum was reported during Go/no go. During interference tasks, likelihood of activation was reported in the left superior frontal gyrus, right precentral gyrus, and left cingulate gyrus, to be decreased, and in the right caudate to be increased. Task switching was associated with extensive decreased likelihood of activation in the middle, medial, inferior, superior frontal gyri, caudate, cingulate and precuneus. A separate ALE meta analysis found consistent abnormalities in orbitofrontal, striatal, lateral frontal, anterior cingulate, middle occipital and parietal, and cerebellar regions.

=== Structural neuroimaging ===
Differences in grey matter, white matter and structural connectivity have been observed in OCD. One meta-analysis reported grey matter increases in the bilateral lenticular nuclei, and grey matter decreases in the ACC (anterior cingulate cortex) and mPFC (medial prefrontal cortex). Another meta-analysis reported that global volumes are not decreased, but the left ACC and OFC demonstrate decreased volume, while the thalamus but not basal ganglia have increased volumes. An ALE meta analysis found increased grey matter in the left postcentral gyrus, middle frontal region, putamen, thalamus, left ACC, and culmen, while decreased grey matter was reported in the right temporal gyrus and left insula extending to the inferior frontal gyrus.

Overlapping abnormalities in white matter volume and diffusivity have been reported. Increased white matter volume and decreased Fractional anisotropy has been observed in anterior midline tracts, interpreted as indicating increased crossings. However, given these effects were most pronounced in medicated adults, it is possible that medication plays a role An ALE meta analysis has observed increased FA in the superior longitudinal fasciculus and corpus callosum, and decreased FA in inferior longitudinal and cingulum fibers.

== Neurochemistry ==
Glutamate, an excitatory neurotransmitter has been implicated in OCD. MRS studies have observed decreased Glx (glutamate, glutamine and GABA) in the striatum. However, increased Glx has been reported in the ACC. Furthermore, increased cerebrospinal fluid (CSF) glutamate and glycine have been found. Various preclinical models have supported glutamate signaling dysfunction in OCD, and treatment with glutamatergic agents such as the glutamate-inhibiting riluzole has been reported to be efficacious.

Reduced dopamine D1 receptors and dopamine D2 receptors in the striatum have been reported in people with OCD, along with both increased and decreased reports of dopamine transporter (DAT) binding. While antipsychotics are sometimes used to treat refractory OCD, they frequently fail in treating or exacerbate OCD symptoms. Treatment with deep brain stimulation is effective in OCD, and response correlates with increased dopamine in the nucleus accumbens. Combined this evidence suggests that OCD may be associated with both increased and decreased dopamine signaling, or that a unidirectional model may not be adequate.

Drug challenge studies have implicated 5-HT_{2A} and 5-HT_{2A} in OCD. Administration of meta-Chlorophenylpiperazine (mCPP), a non selective serotonin (5-HT) release and receptor agonist with a preference for 5-HT_{2C} has been reported to exacerbate OCD symptoms. Psilocybin, a 5-HT_{2C}, 5-HT_{2A} and 5-HT_{1A} receptor agonist has been associated with acute improvement of OCD symptoms. In vivo neuroimaging has found abnormalities with 5-HT_{2A} and serotonin transporter (5-HTT). Inconsistent binding potentials have been observed for 5-HT_{2A}, with both decreased and increased and binding potentials being reported. Inconsistent results have been reported in with respect to 5-HTT as well, with increased, decreased and no changes being reported.

== Estrogen and OCD ==
Aromatase is an enzyme expressed in several gonadic tissue sites. It is the rate-limiting step in the conversion of androgens to estrogen. This conversion can significantly impact estrogen levels in brain areas. These OCD-linked effects have been demonstrated by aromatase knockout mice (ArKO), who lack a functional enzyme to convert androgens to estrogen. This ArKO knockout strategy has provided a model to examine the physiological impact of lower than normal amounts of estrogen.

Studies with ArKO mice have been used to show that varying levels of estrogen affect the onset of OCD behaviors. Lower amounts of estrogen are associated with an increase of OCD behaviors in males more than females.

Variation in estrogen can lead to increased levels of OCD symptoms within women as well. The disorder itself has a later onset in women, and tends to show two distinct peaks of onset. The first peak occurs around puberty and the second around the age of childbearing. These peaks correlate with time periods when heightened estrogen levels suddenly drop in women.

Estrogen is one of the key components of regulating serotonin levels. When it drops suddenly during hormonal changes, this throws the brain off-kilter and makes obsessive thoughts and worries feel much more intense.

Post/peripartum OCD is especially interesting because of the intense hormonal changes women experience. Following childbirth, estrogen and progesterone suddenly decrease, and some women experience onset or worsening of OCD symptoms. A postpartum woman will often have thoughts concerning the accidental or purposeful harm of their baby, and will experience compulsive checking, avoidance, and washing.

A 2024 review by Gorbis et al. described clinical cases involving women with PCOS, menstrual-cycle-related symptom exacerbation, and the onset of OCD following hysterectomy and bilateral oophorectomy. After hormonal and pharmaceutical intervention, symptoms often improved.

In addition, there seems to be a correlation between OCD symptoms and the premenstrual phase of the menstrual cycle. This has been labeled premenstrual exacerbation. Research suggests there may be a link between the fluctuations of estrogen and progesterone and an increase in OCD behaviors like obsessive thoughts and compulsions. A study showed almost half of the female respondents with OCD said their symptoms worsened during this stage.

== See also ==
- Cause of obsessive–compulsive disorder
