= Secondary somatosensory cortex =

Brain region

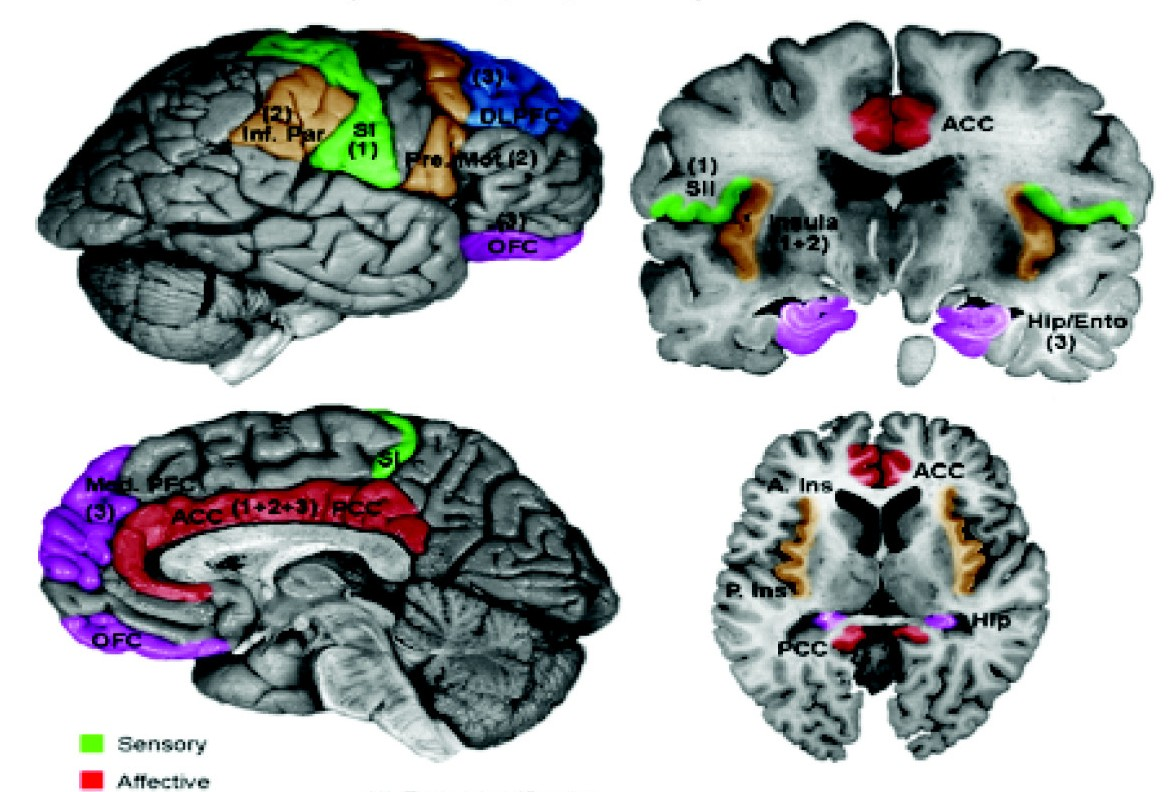
S2 is colored green and the insular cortex brown in the top right image (coronal section) of the human brain. S1 is green in the top left, and the supplementary somatosensory area is green in the bottom left.

The human secondary somatosensory cortex (S2, SII) is a region of sensory cortex in the parietal operculum on the ceiling of the lateral sulcus.

Region S2 was first described by Adrian in 1940, who found that feeling in cats' feet was not only represented in the primary somatosensory cortex (S1) but also in a second region adjacent to S1. In 1954, Penfield and Jasper evoked somatosensory sensations in human patients during neurosurgery by electrically stimulating the ceiling of the lateral sulcus, which lies adjacent to S1, and their findings were confirmed in 1979 by Woolsey et al. using evoked potentials and electrical stimulation. Experiments involving ablation of the second somatosensory cortex in primates indicate that this cortical area is involved in remembering the differences between tactile shapes and textures. Functional neuroimaging studies have found S2 activation in response to light touch, pain, visceral sensation, and tactile attention.

In monkeys, apes and hominids, including humans, region S2 is divided into several "areas". An area at the entrance to the lateral sulcus, adjoining the primary somatosensory cortex (S1), is called the parietal ventral (PV) area. Posterior to PV is the secondary somatosensory area (area S2, which must not be confused with "region S2" which designates the entire secondary somatosensory cortex, of which area S2 is a part). Deeper in the lateral sulcus lies the ventral somatosensory (VS) area, whose outer edge adjoins areas PV and S2 and inner edge adjoins the insular cortex.

In humans, the secondary somatosensory cortex includes parts of Brodmann area (BA) 40 and 43.

Areas PV and S2 both map the body surface. Functional neuroimaging in humans has revealed that in areas PV and S2 the face is represented near the entrance to the lateral sulcus, and the hands and feet deeper in the fissure. Individual neurons in areas PV and S2 receive input from wide areas of the body surface (they have large "receptive fields"), and respond readily to stimuli such as wiping a sponge over a large area of skin.

Area PV connects densely with BA 5 and the premotor cortex. Area S2 is interconnected with BA 1 and densely so with BA 3b, and projects to PV, BA 7b, insular cortex, amygdala and hippocampus. Areas S2 in the left and right hemispheres are densely interconnected, and stimulation on one side of the body will activate area S2 in both hemispheres.

== See also ==
- Brodmann area 5
- Brodmann area 7
