= Richard A. Andersen (neuroscientist) =

American neuroscientist

Richard Alan Andersen
- Born: October 27, 1950 (age 75); New Kensington, Pennsylvania, United States
- Education: University of California, Davis B.S. (1973); University of California, San Francisco Ph.D. (1979)
- Awards: W. Alden Spencer Award (1994)
- Scientific career
- Fields: Neuroscience
- Workplaces: California Institute of Technology Massachusetts Institute of Technology; Salk Institute for Biological Studies Johns Hopkins School of Medicine
- Thesis: Functional Connections of the Central Auditory Nervous System: Thalamocortical, Corticothalamic and Corticotectal Connections of the AI, AII and AAF Auditory Cortical Fields (1979)
- Doctoral advisor: Michael Merzenich
- Other academic advisors: Vernon Benjamin Mountcastle
- Website: www.vis.caltech.edu

Richard Alan Andersen (born October 27, 1950) is an American neuroscientist. He is the James G. Boswell Professor of Neuroscience at the California Institute of Technology in Pasadena, California. His research focuses on visual physiology with an emphasis on translational research to humans in the field of neuroprosthetics, brain-computer interfaces, and cortical repair.

== Biography ==
Andersen was born in New Kensington, Pennsylvania, on October 27, 1950. He received his undergraduate degree in biochemistry at the University of California, Davis, in 1973, working in the laboratory of Prof. Robert Scobey over two summers. Andersen then received his PhD in physiology under the mentorship of Prof. Michael Merzenich from the University of California, San Francisco, in 1979. He completed a postdoctoral fellowship with Prof. Vernon Mountcastle at the Johns Hopkins University School of Medicine in 1981. After serving as an assistant and associate professor at the Salk Institute in La Jolla, California and an adjunct associate professor at the University of California, San Diego, he moved to MIT, first as an associate and later as a full professor in the Department of Brain and Cognitive Science. In 1993 he moved to Caltech to join the Division of Biology.

Andersen, an author of over 200 scientific publications, is a member of the National Academy of Sciences and the Institute of Medicine of the National Academies as well as a fellow of the American Academy of Arts and Sciences, AAAS and the Neuroscience Research Program in La Jolla, California, and he holds several patents in the area of biotechnology. He has served as principal or co-investigator on dozens of grants, raising millions of dollars for basic and applied research in the visual neurosciences. Andersen has served as the director of Caltech's Sloan-Schwartz Center for Theoretical Neurobiology and MIT's McDonnell-Pew Center for Cognitive Neuroscience as well as serving on numerous advisory and editorial boards. He has delivered numerous named lectureships and has served as a visiting professor at the Collège de France.

Awards he has received have included the McKnight Neuroscience Brain Disorders Award, NASA Tech Brief Award, the McKnight Technical Innovation in Neuroscience Award, the Spencer Award from Columbia College of Physicians and Surgeons and the McKnight Foundation Scholars Award. He was elected a Fellow of the American Academy of Arts and Sciences in 2002.

== Research ==
Early work centered on the discovery and elucidation of cortical gain fields, a general rule of multiplicative computation used by many areas of the cortex. Andersen and Zipser of UCSD developed one of the first neural network models of cortical function, which generated a mathematical basis for testing hypotheses based on laboratory findings. His research established that the posterior parietal cortex (PPC) is involved in forming movement intentions—the early and abstract plans for movement. Previously this part of the brain was thought only to function for spatial awareness and attention. His laboratory discovered the lateral intraparietal area (LIP) in the PPC and established its role in eye movements. He also discovered the parietal reach region, an area involved in forming early reach plans. His lab has also made a number of discoveries related to visual motion perception. He established that the middle temporal area processes the perception of form from motion. He found that the perception of the direction of heading, important for navigation, is computed in the brain using both visual stimuli and eye movement signals. His lab has also determined how eye position and limb position signals are combined for eye-hand coordination.

In recent years he has extended his research to translational studies. His group has established that the intention signals from the PPC can be used as control signals for neural prosthetics. Neural prosthetics can assist paralyzed patients by recording their brain signals, interpreting them, and then allowing them to use these processed signals to control external, assistive devices such as robot limbs, computers or wheelchairs simply using by thinking about it. Another new direction the Andersen group is pursuing is the use of electrical stimulation for brain repair.
