= Area 5 =

Area 5 can refer to:

- Area 5 (Nevada National Security Site)
- Brodmann area 5
