= Parietal reach region =

Region of the macaque brain

The parietal reach region (PRR) is a region within the posterior parietal cortex of the macaque brain that is stimulated through reaching for an object. The PRR was initially proposed by Andersen and Buneo, but they just generally explored the idea as postural modulations. Dr. Steven Chang went further in depth by showing the receptive fields of PRR neurons are multiplicatively stimulated through the combination of initial gaze position and initial hand position. This multiplicative stimulation is known as gain-field encoding. The parietal reach region uses gain-field encoding to calculate the amount of hand displacement needed to reach for an object. A recent study shows that neurons in PRR encodes not only the planned physical movement, but also the anticipated visual sensory consequence of the intended movement once the action is unfolded in time.
