= Brodmann area 31 =

Area of the brain

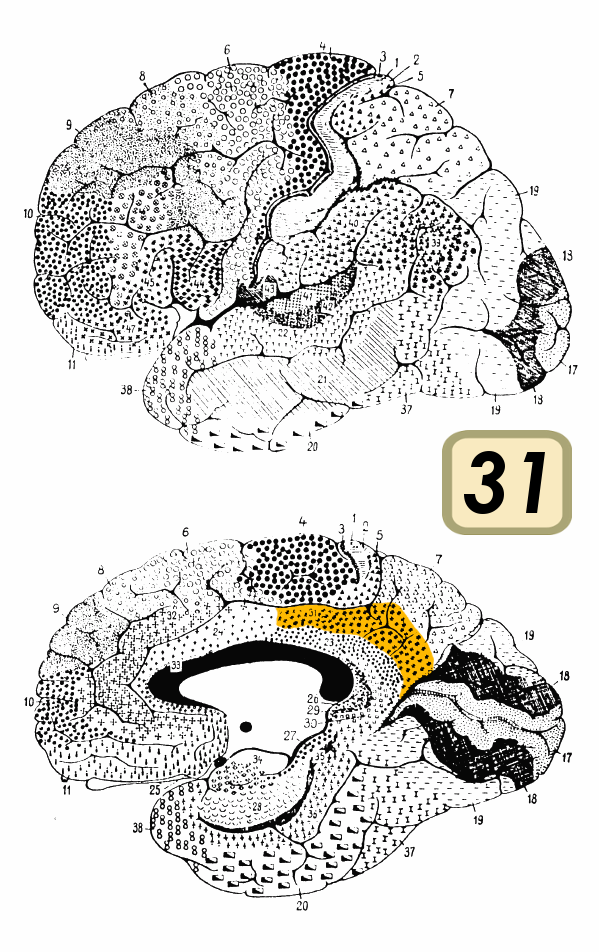

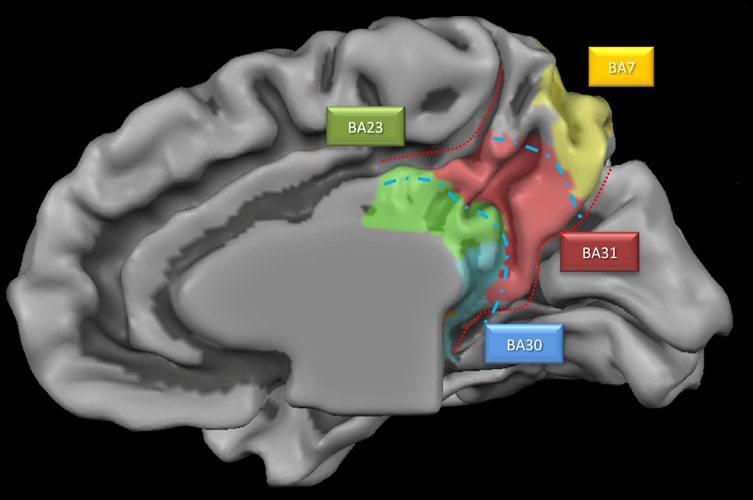
- Medial surface of the human brain. BA31 is shown in red.

Details

Identifiers
- Latin: area cingularis posterior dorsalis
- NeuroLex ID: birnlex_1765
- FMA: 68628

Brodmann area 31, also known as dorsal posterior cingulate area 31, is a subdivision of the cytoarchitecturally defined cingulate region of the cerebral cortex. In the human, it occupies portions of the posterior cingulate gyrus and medial aspect of the parietal lobe. Approximate boundaries are the cingulate sulcus dorsally and the parieto-occipital sulcus caudally. It partially surrounds the subparietal sulcus, the ventral continuation of the cingulate sulcus in the parietal lobe. Cytoarchitecturally it is bounded rostrally by the ventral anterior cingulate area 24, ventrally by the ventral posterior cingulate area 23, dorsally by the gigantopyramidal area 4 and preparietal area 5 and caudally by the superior parietal area 7 (H) (Brodmann-1909).

== See also ==
- Brodmann area
