= Agraphesthesia =

Disorientation of the skin's sensation across its space

Agraphesthesia is a disorder of directional cutaneous kinesthesia or disorientation of the skin's sensation across its space. It is difficult to recognize a written number or letter traced on the skin after parietal damage.

== Causes ==
Agraphesthesia, or the lack of graphesthesia ability, results from brain damage, particularly to the parietal lobe, thalamus, and secondary somatosensory cortex.

A significant relationship has been found between agraphesthesia and people living with Alzheimer's disease. Alzheimer's patients typically experience the lack of sensation in both their dominant and non-dominant hands. Astereognosis, the inability to identify a physical object solely by touch, is commonly found in conjunction with agraphesthesia in Alzheimer's patients. Some research suggest that agraphesthesia can be used to track the cognitive decline in Alzheimer's patients once the disease is diagnosed.

Studies also show that patients diagnosed with schizophrenia and their immediate relatives have a decreased ability to perform graphesthesia tasks in comparison to people without relatives diagnosed with schizophrenia. Therefore, researchers have suggested that somatosensory dysfunction in the parietal cortex is a potential cause of graphesthesia impairments.

== Diagnosis ==
A diagnosis of agraphesthesia is determined using a variety of tests, such as the Palm Writing subtest. The Palm Writing subtest involves a series of trials where patients are asked to identify whether an X or an O was written on the palm of their hand. Just as numbers and shapes may be used in addition to letters, similar neurological tests can be carried out on other parts of the body, such as the forearm and the abdomen. For tests of graphesthesia like the Palm Writing subtest, it is important that subjects do not see what is being traced on their palm because this can bias the subjects' responses. Subjects can be blindfolded or a screen can be used to obstruct the subject's view of the area being tested.
