= Gain-field encoding =

Gain field encoding is a hypothesis about the internal storage and processing of limb motion in the brain. In the motor areas of the brain, there are neurons which collectively have the ability to store information regarding both limb positioning and velocity in relation to both the body (intrinsic) and the individual's external environment (extrinsic). The input from these neurons is taken multiplicatively, forming what is referred to as a gain field. The gain field works as a collection of internal models off of which the body can base its movements. The process of encoding and recalling these models is the basis of muscle memory.

== Physiology ==
Neurons involved in gain field encoding work multiplicatively, taking the input from several together to form the gain field. It is this process that allows the complexity of motor control. Instead of simply encoding the motion of the limb in which a specific motion is desired, the multiplicative nature of the gain field ensures that the positioning of the rest of the body is taken in to consideration. This process allows for motor coordination of flexible bimanual actions as opposed to restricting the individual to unimanual motion. For example, when considering the movement of both arms, the body calls upon gain field models for each arm in order to compensate for the mechanical interactions created by both.

=== Location ===
Most gain field activity is based in the premotor cortex found in the frontal lobe anterior to the primary motor cortex, however it receives input from a variety of locations in the brain. These incoming signals provide frame of reference information through the individual's senses. Further evidence suggests that the cerebellum and posterior parietal cortex (PPC) also play major functional roles in gain field encoding. The intrinsic and extrinsic properties of the gain field can be shown as products of the PPC. In Brodmann area 7 of the PPC, the positioning of objects with respect to the eyes is represented completely extrinsically with no input from the positioning of the body involved. This opposes the case of other parts of the PPC such as Brodmann area 5 which represents objects in relation to body defined coordinates. Due to the extrinsic and intrinsic properties of motor functioning, it is speculated that these types of signals are both taken multiplicatively to form the gain field. With input from each area, a three-dimensional representation of the objects in space can be arranged for use by the rest of the motor system.

Unsurprisingly lesions in the parietal cortex lead to deficiencies in an individual's spatial movements and coordination and, in some cases, hemineglect. These effects were widely variable from person to person and depending on the location of the lesion further hinting at the complicated nature of gain modulated neurons.

=== Gain Modulation ===
One of the key components of gain-field encoding is the variability in the response amplitude of the action potentials from neurons. This variability, when independent of change in response selectivity, is called gain modulation. Gain Modulation takes place in many cortical areas and is believed to be a common mechanism of neuronal computation. It allows for the combination of different sensory and cognitive information. For example, neurons implicated in processing a part of the visual field see a gain in the response amplitude due to shifting focus to that part of the field of vision. Therefore, neurons that are gain modulated can represent multiple types of information. The multi-modal nature of these neurons makes them ideal for specific types of computations, mainly coordinate transformations. This creates the ability to think spatially, the main contributor to physical coordination.

=== Encoding Process ===
The encoding of the neurons involved in the motor gain field follow the same gain modulation principles as most of the neurons within the brain. That is to say, when gain is increased, the connections between the neurons firing increase in strength leading to further gain if the neurons continue to receive stimulation. This observation is why repetition of a particular set of motions is what leads to muscle memory.

=== Coordinate Manipulation ===
One of the main results of gain-field encoding is the cognitive ability to manipulate different coordinate planes that are dealt with daily and adjust limb muscle movements accordingly. A good example of this is moving a pointer across a computer screen with a mouse. Depending on the relative location of the user's head to the computer screen as well as the angle at which the screen is being observed, the user's perspective of the screen will be very different. A mentally mapped grid of the screen appears much larger when the user is closer to the screen as opposed to further away, and it is the brain's ability to keep a consistent mental representation that gives people the ability to function under such dynamic conditions.

== Mathematical Representation ==
The equation for the firing rate of a gain modulated neuron is a combination of the two types of information being transmitted to the neuron:

$r = f(x)g(y)$

where $r$ is the rate of fire, $f(x)$ is a function of one type of information input and $g(y)$ is another. For example, neural activity for the interaction between gaze direction and retinal image location is almost exactly multiplicative, where $x$ represents the location of a stimulus in retinal coordinates and $y$ represents gaze angle. The primary process by which this interaction can take place is speculated to be recurrent neural networks where neural connections form a directed cycle. Recurrent circuitry is abundant in cortical networks and reportedly plays a role in sustaining signals, signal amplification, and response selectivity.

== Evidence ==
Early hypotheses of gain field encoding suggested that the gain field works as a model for motion additively. This would mean that if two limbs needed to move, models for each would be called separately but at the same time. However, more recent studies in which more complex motor movements are observed have found that the gain field is created multiplicatively in order to allow the body to adapt to the constantly changing frames of reference experienced in everyday life.

This multiplicative property is an effect of recurrent neural circuitry. A target neuron that takes only two types of direct input can only combine them additively. However mathematical models show that when also receiving recursive input from neighboring neurons, the resulting transformation to the target neurons firing rate is multiplicative. In this model, neurons with overlapping receptive fields excite each other, multiplying the strength. Likewise, neurons with non-overlapping receptive fields are inhibitory. The result is a response curve that is a scaled representation of the simple additive model.

Typical neural population code. Each color represents a separate, adjacent neuron arranged linearly. X axis shows stimulus, such as head position or sound frequency, and Y axis shows neural response. In a gain field these action potentials are taken recurrently with another relevant stimulus.

Observation of human developmental patterns also lend evidence toward this theory of gain-field encoding and gain modulation. Since arm movements are based on both intrinsic and extrinsic models, in order to build these connections one has to learn by self-generating movements and watching. By moving the arms to different parts of space and following with the eyes, the neurons form connections based on mechanical body movements as well as their positioning in an external space. Ideally this is done from every possible gaze angle and position available. This provides your brain with the proper translations by aligning the retinal (extrinsic) and body-centered (intrinsic) representations of space. It is not surprising that before babies develop motor control of their limbs, they tend to flail and watch their own limbs move.

A similar effect is found when people track moving objects with their eyes. The changing retinal image is referenced with the muscle movements of the eye resulting in the same type of retinal/body-centered alignment. This is one more process that helps the brain properly encode the relationships needed to deal with our changing perception, and also serves as a verification that the proper physical movements are being made.

A contrary hypothesis to gain field encoding involved implicating the neurons of the primary motor cortex (M1) in dynamic muscle movement. An investigation into area M1 shows that when an individual is asked to rotate an object, activation of the neurons in M1 thought to be controlling the motion happened instantaneously with muscle activation. This provides evidence for preliminary steps from higher motor areas communicating with area M1 by means of gain modulation.

== See also ==
- Muscle memory
- Neural coding
- Encoding (Memory)
- Recurrent neural network
- Gain
