= Area 23 =

Area 23 can refer to:

- Area 23 (Nevada National Security Site)
- Brodmann area 23
