= Primary somatosensory cortex =

Region of the brain which processes touch

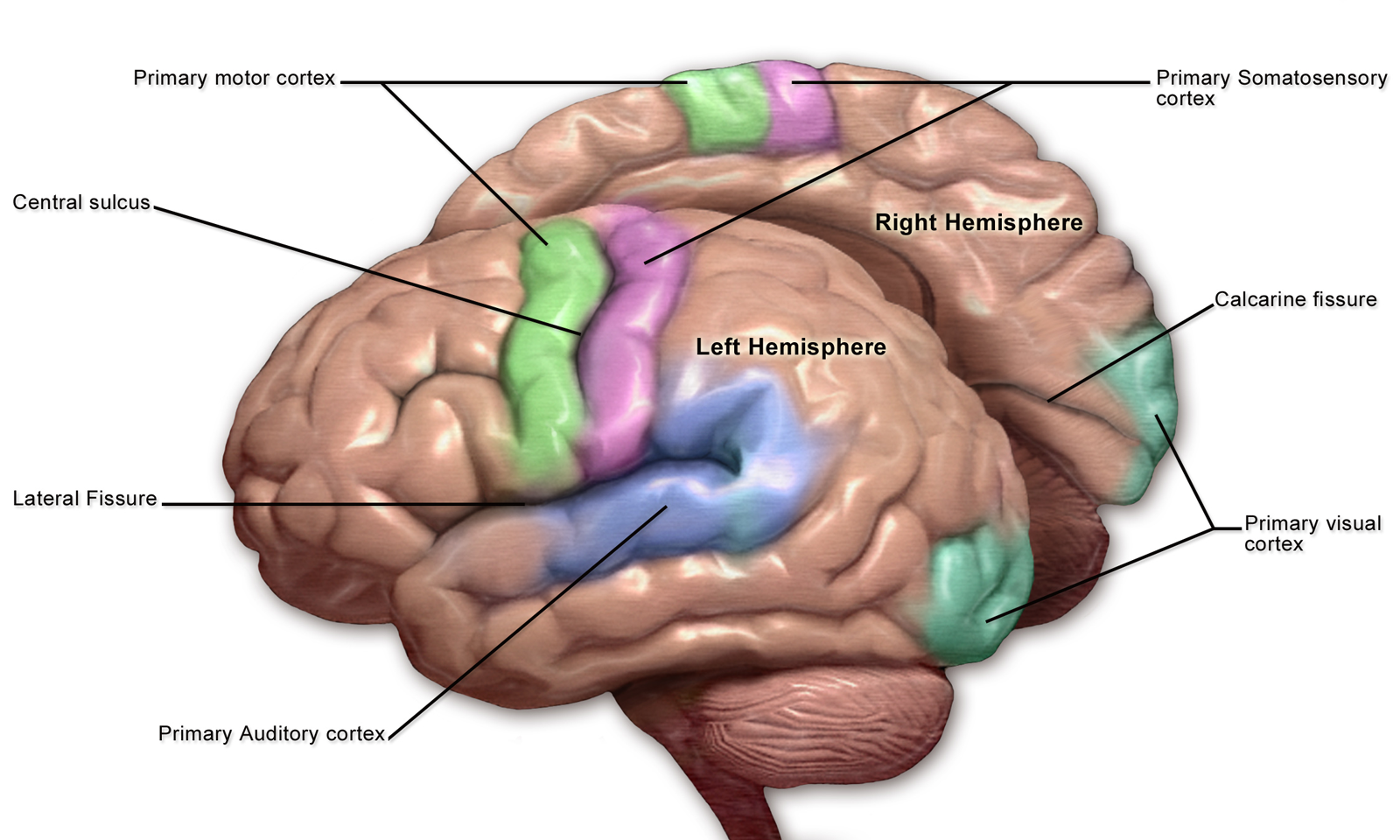
- Primary somatosensory cortex labeled in purple

- Primary somatosensory cortex: second image.

In neuroanatomy, the primary somatosensory cortex is located in the postcentral gyrus of the brain's parietal lobe, and is part of the somatosensory system. It was initially defined from surface stimulation studies of Wilder Penfield, and parallel surface potential studies of Bard, Woolsey, and Marshall. Although initially defined to be roughly the same as Brodmann areas 3, 1 and 2, more recent work by Kaas has suggested that for homogeny with other sensory fields only area 3 should be referred to as "primary somatosensory cortex", as it receives the bulk of the thalamocortical projections from the sensory input fields.

At the primary somatosensory cortex, tactile representation is orderly arranged (in an inverted fashion) from the toe (at the top of the cerebral hemisphere) to mouth (at the bottom). However, some body parts may be controlled by partially overlapping regions of cortex. Each cerebral hemisphere of the primary somatosensory cortex only contains a tactile representation of the opposite (contralateral) side of the body. The amount of primary somatosensory cortex devoted to a body part is not proportional to the absolute size of the body surface, but instead to the relative density of cutaneous tactile receptors located on that body part (sometimes pictures as a cortical homunculus). The density of cutaneous tactile receptors on a body part is generally indicative of the degree of sensitivity of tactile stimulation experienced at said body part. For this reason, the human lips and hands have a larger representation than other body parts.

== Structure ==
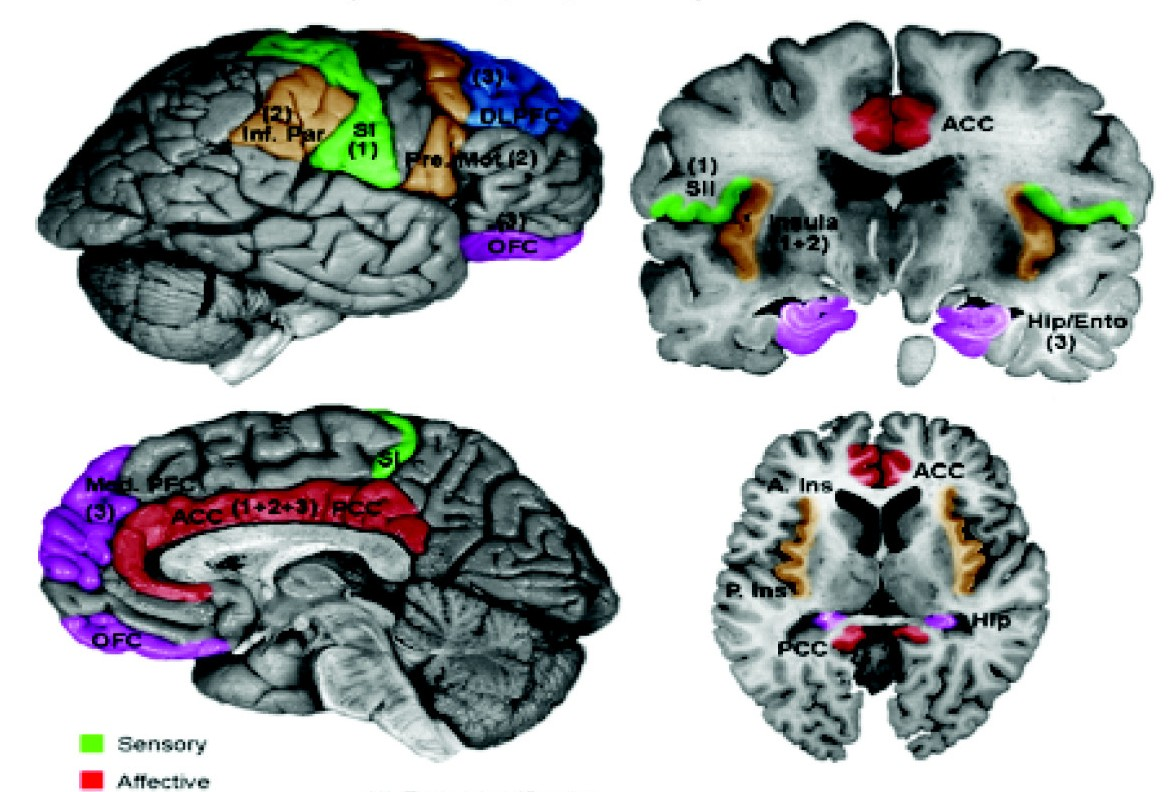
Primary somatosensory cortex labeled in green S1

=== Brodmann areas 3, 1, and 2 ===
Brodmann areas 3, 1, and 2 make up the primary somatosensory cortex of the human brain (or S1). Because Brodmann sliced the brain somewhat obliquely, he encountered area 1 first; however, from anterior to posterior, the Brodmann designations are 3, 1, and 2, respectively.

Brodmann area (BA) 3 is subdivided into two cytoarchitectonic areas labeled as 3a and 3b.

== Clinical significance ==
Lesions affecting the primary somatosensory cortex produce characteristic symptoms including: agraphesthesia, astereognosia, hemihypesthesia, and loss of vibration, proprioception and fine touch (because the third-order neuron of the medial-lemniscal pathway cannot synapse in the cortex). It can also produce hemineglect, if it affects the non-dominant hemisphere. Destruction of brodmann area 3, 1, and 2 results in contralateral hemihypesthesia and astereognosis.

It could also reduce nociception, thermoception, and crude touch, but, since information from the spinothalamic tract is interpreted mainly by other areas of the brain (see insular cortex and cingulate gyrus), it is not as relevant as the other symptoms.

== See also ==
- List of regions in the human brain
