= Hemihypesthesia =

Medical condition in Human Body

Hemihypesthesia is a reduction in sensitivity on one side of the body. A person with this condition may not be able to perceive being lightly touched on one side, but has normal function on the other side of the body.

It can occur from damage to the thalamocortical fibers in the posterior limb of the internal capsule. It is one of the deficits produced by anterior choroidal artery syndrome. The anterior choroidal artery is in the brain, off of the internal carotid in the "circle of Willis".
