= Posterior cingulate cortex =

Caudal part of the cingulate cortex of the brain

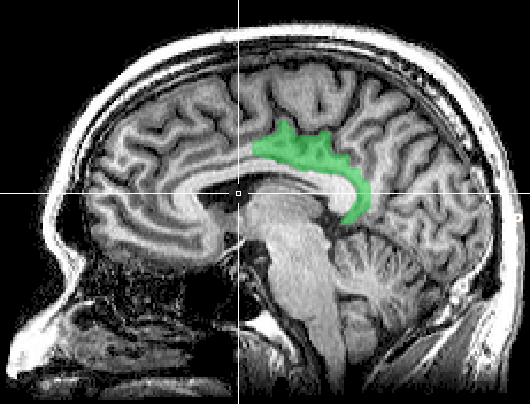
- Sagittal MRI slice with highlighting indicating location of the posterior cingulate

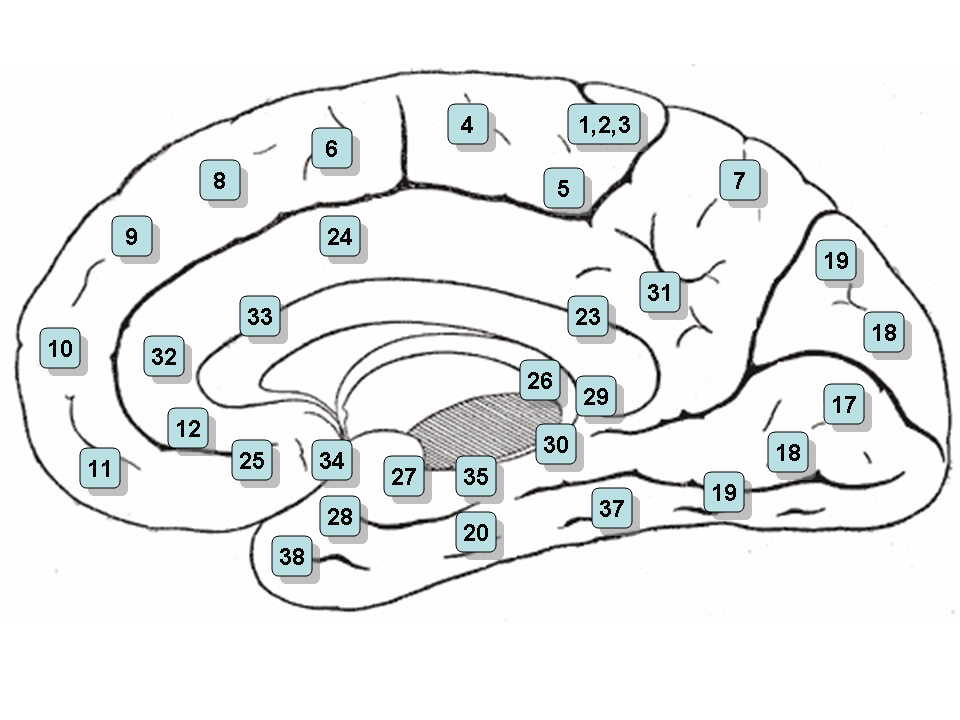
- Medial surface. (Areas 23 and 31 at center right.)

Details
- Part of: Cingulate gyrus

Identifiers
- Latin: cortex cingularis posterior
- NeuroNames: 162
- NeuroLex ID: birnlex_950
- FMA: 61924

The posterior cingulate cortex (PCC) is the caudal part of the cingulate cortex, located posterior to the anterior cingulate cortex. This is the upper part of the "limbic lobe". The cingulate cortex is made up of an area around the midline of the brain. Surrounding areas include the retrosplenial cortex and the precuneus.

Cytoarchitectonically the posterior cingulate cortex is associated with Brodmann areas 23 and 31.

The PCC forms a central node in the default mode network of the brain. It has been shown to communicate with various brain networks simultaneously and is involved in diverse functions. Along with the precuneus, the PCC has been implicated as a neural substrate for human awareness in numerous studies of both the anesthetized and vegetative (coma) states. Imaging studies indicate a prominent role for the PCC in pain and episodic memory retrieval. Increased size of the ventral PCC is related to a decline in working memory performance. The PCC has also been strongly implicated as a key part of several intrinsic control networks.

== Anatomy ==
=== Location and boundaries ===
The posterior cingulate cortex lies behind the anterior cingulate cortex, forming a part of the posteromedial cortex, along with the retrosplenial cortex (Brodmann areas 29 and 30) and precuneus (located posterior and superior to the PCC). The PCC, together with the retrosplenial cortex, forms the retrosplenial gyrus. The posterior cingulate cortex is bordered by the following brain regions: the marginal ramus of the cingulate sulcus (superiorly), the corpus callosum (inferiorly), the parieto-occipital sulcus (posteriorly), and Brodmann area 24 (anteriorly).

=== Cytoarchitectural organization ===
The posterior cingulate cortex is considered a paralimbic cortical structure, consisting of Brodmann areas 23 and 31. As part of the paralimbic cortex, it has fewer than six layers, placing its cell architecture in between the six-layered neocortex and the more primitive allocortex of core limbic structures. It has also been associated with the hippocampocentric subdivision of the paralimbic zone. The cytoarchitecture of the PCC is not entirely uniform, instead it contains distinct anterior and dorsal subregions, which are increasingly understood as distinct in function, as well as cytoarchitectural structure.

=== Structural connections ===
==== Nonhuman structure ====
In non-human primates the following structural connections of the posterior cingulate cortex are well documented:

- Reciprocal connection with other regions of the posteromedial cortex.
- High connectivity to other paralimbic and limbic structures.
- Reciprocal connections to the medial temporal lobe.
- Dense connections to the hippocampal formation, the parahippocampal cortex, the ventromedial prefrontal cortex, and subgenual parts of the anterior cingulate cortex.
- Prominent connections to the areas of heteromodal association in the front, temporal and parietal lobes.
- Strong reciprocal connections to the dorsolateral prefrontal cortex (roughly Brodmann area 46) and the frontal poles (Brodmann areas 10 and 11).
- Less prominent connections to Brodmann areas 9/46, 8 and 9.
- Connections to the dorsal parts of the anterior cingulate cortex.
- Dense connections to the thalamus in the form of a continuous strip that crosses numerous pulvinar nuclei and the striatum.

As is true in other areas of the posteromedial cortex, the posterior cingulate cortex has no apparent connections to primary sensory or motor areas. Thus, it is unlikely to be involved in low-level sensory or motor processing.

==== Human structure ====
While many of the connections in non-human primates may be present in humans, they are less well documented. Studies have shown strong reciprocal connections to medial temporal lobe memory structures, such as the entorhinal cortex and the parahippocampal gyrus, the latter being involved in associative learning and episodic memory. In humans, the PCC is also connected to areas involved in emotion and social behavior, attention (the lateral intraparietal cortex and precuneus), learning and motivation (the anterior and lateral thalamic nucleus, caudate nucleus, orbitofrontal cortex and anterior cingulate cortex).

== Function ==
The posterior cingulate cortex is highly connected and one of the most metabolically active regions in the brain, but there is no consensus as to its cognitive role. Cerebral blood flow and metabolic rate in the PCC are approximately 40% higher than average across the brain. The high functional connectivity of the PCC, signifies extensive intrinsic connectivity networks (networks of brain regions involved in a range of tasks that share common spatio-temporal patterns of activity).

=== Emotion and memory ===
The posterior cingulate cortex has been linked by lesion studies to spatial memory, configural learning, and maintenance of discriminative avoidance learning. More recently the PCC was shown to display intense activity when autobiographical memories (such as those concerning friends and family) are recalled successfully. In a study involving autobiographical recollection, the caudal part of the left PCC was the only brain structure highly active in all subjects. Furthermore, the PCC does not show this same activation during attempted but unsuccessful retrieval, implying an important role in successful memory retrieval (see below: Alzheimer's disease).

The posterior cingulate cortex has also been firmly linked to emotional salience. Thus, it has been hypothesized that the emotional importance of autobiographical memories may contribute to the strength and consistency of activity in the PCC upon successful recollection of these memories. The posterior cingulate cortex is significantly bilaterally activated by emotional stimuli, independent of valence (positive or negative). This is in contrast to other structures in the limbic system, such as the amygdala, which are thought to respond disproportionately to negative stimuli, or the left frontal pole, which activated only in response to positive stimuli. These results support the hypothesis that the posterior cingulate cortex mediates interactions between emotion and memory.

=== Intrinsic control networks ===
The posterior cingulate cortex exhibits connectivity with a wide range of intrinsic control networks. Its most widely known role is as a central node in the default mode network (DMN). The default mode network (and the PCC) is highly reactive and quickly deactivates during tasks with externally directed, or presently centered, attention (such as working memory or meditation). Conversely, the DMN is active when attention is internally directed (during episodic memory retrieval, planning, and daydreaming). A failure of the DMN to deactivate at proper times is associated with poor cognitive function, thereby indicating its importance in attention.

In addition to the default mode network, the posterior cingulate cortex is also involved in the dorsal attention network (a top-down control of visual attention and eye movement) and the frontoparietal control network (involved in executive motor control). Furthermore, fMRI studies have shown that the posterior cingulate cortex activates during visual tasks when some form of monetary incentive is involved, essentially functioning as a neural interface between motivation-related areas and top-down control of visual attention.

The relationship between these networks within the PCC is not clearly understood. When activity increases in the dorsal attention network and the frontoparietal control network, it must simultaneously decrease in the DMN in a closely correlated way. This anti-correlated pattern is indicative of the various differences and importance of subregions in the posterior cingulate cortex.

Considering the relation of the PCC with the DMN, with suppressed posterior cingulate activity favoring low cognitive introspection and higher external attention and increased activity indicating memory retrieval and planning, it has been hypothesized that this brain region is heavily involved in noticing internal and external changes and in facilitating novel behavior or thought in response. High activity, then, would indicate continued operation with the current cognitive set, while lower activity would indicate exploration, flexibility and renewed learning.

An alternative hypothesis is focused more on the difference between the dorsal and ventral subregions and takes into consideration their functional separation. In this model, the PCC is hypothesized to take a chief regulatory role in focusing internal and external attention. Mounting evidence that the PCC is involved in both integrating memories of experiences and initiating a signal to change behavioral strategies supports this hypothesis. Under this model, the PCC plays a crucial role in controlling state of arousal, the breadth of focus and the internal or external focus of attention. This hypothesis emphasizes the PCC as a dynamic network, rather than a fixed and unchanging structure.

While both of the hypotheses are the result of scientific studies, the role of the PCC is still not well understood and there remains much work to be done to investigate the extent of their veracity.

=== Meditation ===
From neuroimaging studies and subjective descriptions, the PCC has been found to be activated during self-related thinking and deactivated during meditation. Using generative topographic mapping, it was further found that undistracted, effortless mind wandering corresponds with PCC deactivation, whereas distracted and controlled awareness corresponds with PCC activation. These results track closely with findings about the role of the PCC in the DMN.

== Disorders ==
Structural and functional abnormalities in the PCC result in a range of neurological and psychiatric disorders. The PCC likely integrates and mediates information in the brain. Therefore, functional abnormalities of the PCC might be an accumulation of remote and widespread damage in the brain.

=== Alzheimer's disease ===
The PCC is commonly affected by neurodegenerative disease. In fact, reduced metabolism in the PCC has been identified as an early sign of Alzheimer's disease, and is frequently present before a clinical diagnosis. The reduced metabolism in the PCC is typically one part in a diffuse pattern of metabolic dysfunction in the brain that includes medial temporal lobe structures and the anterior thalamus, abnormalities that may be the result of damage in isolated but connected regions. For instance, Meguro et al. (1999) show that experimental damage of the rhinal cortex results in hypometabolism of the PCC. In Alzheimer's disease, metabolic abnormality is linked to amyloid deposition and brain atrophy with a spatial distribution that resembles the nodes of the default mode network. In early Alzheimer's, functional connectivity within the DMN is reduced, affecting the connection between the PCC and the hippocampus, and these altered patterns can reflect ApoE genetic status (a risk factor associated with the disease). It has been found that neurodegenerative diseases spread 'prion-like' through the brain. For example, when the proteins amyloid-b and TDP-43 are in their abnormal form, they spread across synapses and are associated with neurodegeneration. This transmission of abnormal protein would be constrained by the organization of white matter connections and could potentially explain the spatial distribution of pathology within the DMN, in Alzheimer's . In Alzheimer's disease, the topology of white matter connectivity helps in predicting atrophic patterns, possibly explaining why the PCC is affected in the early stages of the disease.

=== Autism spectrum disorder ===
Autism spectrum disorders (ASDs) are associated with metabolic and functional abnormalities of the PCC. Individuals with ASDs show reduction in metabolism, exhibit abnormal functional responses and demonstrate reductions in functional connectivity. One study showed these reductions are prominent in the PCC. Studies have shown that the abnormalities in cingulate responses during interpersonal interaction correlate with the severity of symptoms in ASD, and the failure to show task dependent deactivation in the PCC correlates with overall social function. Finally, post-mortem studies show that the PCC in patients with ASD have cytoarchitectonic abnormalities, including reduced levels of GABA A receptors and benzodiazepine binding sites.

=== Attention deficit hyperactivity disorder ===
It has been suggested that ADHD is a disorder of the DMN, where neural systems are disrupted by uncontrolled activity that leads to attentional lapses. In a meta-analysis of structural MRI studies, Nakao et al. (2011) found that patients with ADHD exhibit an increased left PCC, suggesting that developmental abnormalities affect the PCC. In fact, PCC function is abnormal in ADHD. Within the DMN, functional connectivity is reduced and resting state activity is used to diagnose ADHD in children. Treatment for ADHD, includes psychostimulant medication that directly affects PCC activity. Other studies addressing medication for PCC abnormalities, report that the PCC may only respond to stimulant treatments and the effectiveness of medication can be dependent on motivation levels. Furthermore, ADHD has been associated with the gene SNAP25. In healthy children, SNAP25 polymorphism is linked to working memory capacity, altered PCC structure, and task-dependent PCC deactivation patterns on working memory task.

=== Depression ===
Abnormal PCC functional connectivity has been linked to major depression, with variable results. One study reports increased PCC functional connectivity, while another shows that untreated patients had decreased functional connectivity from the PCC to the caudate. Other studies have looked at interactions between the PCC and the sub-genual cingulate region (Brodmann area 25), a region of the brain that potentially causes depression. The anterior node of the DMN is formed, in part, by the highly connected PCC and Brodmann area 25. These two regions are metabolically overactive in treatment resistant major depression. The link between the activity in the PCC and Brodmann area 25 correlates with rumination, a feature of depression. This link between the two regions could influence medication responses in patients. Already, it has been found that both regions show alterations in metabolism after antidepressant treatment. Furthermore, patients who undergo deep brain stimulation, have increased glucose metabolism and cerebral flow in the PCC, while also showing an altered Brodmann area 25.

=== Schizophrenia ===
Abnormal activity in the PCC has been linked to schizophrenia, a mental disorder with common symptoms such as hallucinations, delusions, disorganized thinking, and a lack of emotional intelligence. What is common between symptoms is that they have to do with an inability to distinguish between internal and external events. Two PET studies on patients with schizophrenia showed abnormal metabolism in the PCC. One study reports that glucose metabolism was decreased in people with schizophrenia, while another shows abnormal glucose metabolism that was highly correlated in the pulvinar and the PCC. In the latter study, thalamic interactions with the frontal lobes were reduced, which could mean that schizophrenia affects thalamocortical connections. Further abnormalities in the PCC, abnormal NMDA, cannabinoid, and GABAergic receptor binding have been found with post-mortem autoradiography of people with schizophrenia. Abnormalities in the structure and white matter connections of the PCC have also been recorded in patients with schizophrenia. Those with a poor outcome often have reduced PCC volume. Furthermore, white matter abnormalities in the cingulum bundle, a structure that connects the PCC to other limbic structures, are found in some patients with schizophrenia. In functional MRI studies, abnormal PCC function., has been linked to increases and decreases in functional connectivity. There are also abnormal PCC responses during task performance. These abnormalities may contribute to psychotic symptoms of some persons with schizophrenia. Research on the effect of the psychedelic drug psilocybin shows that the altered state of consciousness induced by this drug can be correlated with abnormal metabolism and functional connectivity of the PCC, as well as a reduction in the strength of anti-correlations between the DMN and the frontoparietal control network (FPCN). Because these networks contribute to internal and external cognition, abnormalities in the PCC might contribute to psychosis in some types of schizophrenia.

=== Traumatic brain injury ===
After traumatic brain injury (TBI), abnormalities have been shown in the PCC. Often, head injuries produce widespread axonal injury that disconnect brain regions and lead to cognitive impairment. This is also related to reduced metabolism within the PCC. Studies of performance on simple choice reaction time tasks after TBI show, in particular, that the pattern of functional connectivity from the PCC to the rest of the DMN can predict TBI impairments. They also found that greater damage to the cingulum bundle, that connects the PCC to the anterior DMN, was correlated with sustained attention impairment. In a subsequent study, it was found that TBIs are related to a difficulty in switching from automatic to controlled responses. Within selected tasks, patients with TBI showed impaired motor inhibition that was associated with failure to rapidly reactive the PCC. Collectively, this suggests that the failure to control the PCC/DMN activity can lead to attentional lapses in TBI patients.

=== Anxiety disorders ===
There is accumulating evidence for PCC dysfunction underlying many childhood/adolescent-onset mental disorders. Further, anxiety disorder patients show an association between increased extinction–related PCC activity and greater symptom severity. PCC dysfunction may also play a role in anxiety disorders during adolescence.

== See also ==
- Cingulate cortex
- Cingulum
