= Cause of obsessive–compulsive disorder =

The cause of obsessive–compulsive disorder is understood mainly through identifying biological risk factors that lead to obsessive–compulsive disorder (OCD) symptomology. The leading hypotheses propose the involvement of the orbitofrontal cortex, basal ganglia, and/or the limbic system, with discoveries being made in the fields of neuroanatomy, neurochemistry, neuroimmunology, neurogenetics, and neuroethology.

== Drug-induced OCD ==
Many different types of medication can create or induce OCD in patients that have never had symptoms before. A new chapter about OCD in the DSM-5 (2013) now specifically includes drug-induced OCD.

Atypical antipsychotics (second generation antipsychotics), such as olanzapine (Zyprexa), have been proven to induce de-novo OCD in patients.

== Neuroanatomy ==
Although there has been substantial debate regarding the assessment of OCD, current research has gravitated toward structural and functional neuroimaging. These technological innovations have provided a better understanding of the neuroanatomical risk factors of OCD. These studies can be divided into four basic categories: (1) resting studies that compare brain activity at rest in patients with OCD to controls, (2) symptom provocation studies that compare brain activity before and after incitement of symptoms, (3) treatment studies that compare brain activity before and after treatment with pharmacotherapy, and (4) cognitive activation studies that compare brain activity while performing a task in patients with OCD to controls.

Data obtained from this research suggests that three brain areas are involved with OCD: the orbitofrontal cortex (OFC), the anterior cingulate cortex (ACC), and the head of the caudate nucleus. Several studies have found that in patients with OCD, these areas: (1) are hyperactive at rest relative to healthy control; (2) become increasingly active with symptom provocation; and (3) no longer exhibit hyperactivity following successful treatment with SRI pharmacotherapy or cognitive-based therapy. This understanding is frequently cited as evidence that abnormality in these neuroanatomical regions may cause OCD.

The OFC and ACC are intricately connected to the basal ganglia via the cortico-basal ganglia-thalamo-cortical loop. Current theories suggest that OCD may be the result of an imbalance between the "direct" and "indirect" pathways through the basal ganglia. The direct pathways are described as running from the cortex to the striatum, then to the globus pallidus internal segment (GPi) and substantia nigra pars reticulate (SNr), then to the thalamus, and finally back to the cortex. The indirect pathways are described as running from the cortex to the striatum, then to the globus pallidus external segment (GPe), the subthalamic nucleus (STN), the GPi and SNr, then thalamus, and finally back to the cortex. While the net effect of the direct pathway is excitatory, the net effect of the indirect pathway is inhibitory. Thus, it has been hypothesized that excessive relative activity in the direct pathway in OFC/ACC CBGTC loops may result in a positive feedback loop whereby obsessive thoughts are trapped.

Recent studies suggest that OCD is also associated with reduced functional connectivity between the cerebellum and the cortico-striato-thalamo-cortical (CSTC) circuit, indicating a potential role of cerebellar dysfunction in its pathophysiology.

Although structural and functional neuroimaging studies have provided a strong basis for this supposition, it is still unclear why patients with OCD develop specific obsessions instead of a generalized obsessive behavior towards everything. While researchers have suggested that a response bias exists toward particular stimuli, such as contamination, the underlying cause is still unclear. Most likely, this is due to the individual significance and value of certain topics and objects.

== Neurochemistry ==
While there seems to be a ubiquitous understanding that neurochemical functioning is responsible for mediating the symptoms of OCD, recent psychopharmacologic studies have found that the serotonin (5-HT) neurotransmitter system plays a particularly critical role. In comparison to healthy controls, the long-term administration of selective serotonin reuptake inhibitors (SSRIs) have been found to be more effective than noradrenergic reuptake inhibitors in the treatment of OCD. For example, Rapoport et al. demonstrated that clomipramine was more effective than desipramine in decreasing several types of repetitive behavior. Research has also shown that the administration of 5-HT antagonists often exacerbates symptoms of OCD. If this were to be true, one would expect mirtazapine (which among others is a 5-HT_{2A} receptor antagonist) and atypical antipsychotics that also have antagonistic effects at this receptor to attenuate the effect of SSRIs. Clinical studies with these drugs, however, have shown the opposite. Mirtazapine, although not effective by itself, has been shown to hasten the effect of paroxetine (Pallanti et al., 2004), and several studies have shown that atypical antipsychotics augment the effects of SSRIs in refractory OCD patients (Bloch et al., 2006). While these findings do not provide an explicit cause, they do set the stage for the notion that psychiatric conditions can be dissected pharmacologically. Thus, the efficacy in controlling obsessions and compulsions with SSRIs suggests that OCD has an underlying neurochemical etiology.

Dopaminergic systems are implicated in OCD by the efficacy of dopaminergic agents and by various neuroimaging studies. OCD may be treated with antipsychotic agents, however psychostimulants agents have also shown some promise in alleviating the symptoms of OCD. Although these need to be reconciled, they both implicate the dopaminergic systems. OCD also has a high comorbidity with ADHD, which is treated with psychostimulants and may result from increased phasic and decreased tonic signaling of dopaminergic neurons. PANDAS also affects the basal ganglia, where dopamine plays a large role as a neurotransmitter.

== Neuroimmunology ==
The controversial PANDAS hypothesis suggests that neuroimmunological post-streptococcal autoimmunity may be a potential environmental cause of childhood onset OCD. Following a streptococcal infection, a subgroup of children expressed sudden onset of OCD symptom exacerbations. The primary hypothesis of PANDAS and the broader PANS is that OCD may develop as a consequence of an autoimmune reaction in which antibodies to streptococcal infections attack and damage the basal ganglia.

Obsessions and compulsions are also very common in several other medical conditions, including: Tourette syndrome, Parkinson disease, epilepsy, schizophrenia, Huntington disease, encephalitis lethargica, Sydenham chorea, and damage to specific brain regions. Similar to OCD, these disorders also exhibit abnormalities in the basal ganglia. This portion of the brain is responsible for mediating cognition, emotion, and movement. Disruption of the basal ganglia results in a host of symptoms that are characterized by compulsivity (behavioral patterns that are released repeatedly) and impulsivity (behavioral patterns that are released suddenly by various stimuli). This suggests that in patients with OCD, the disorder may be the result of abnormal functioning of the basal ganglia.

== Neurogenetics ==
=== Studies suggesting genetic factors ===
Twin studies and family association studies have demonstrated that there are definite genetic factors underlying obsessive–compulsive disorder. The majority of family association studies demonstrated that at least some forms of OCD are familial. The rate of OCD among relatives of affected individuals was significantly higher than the estimated population prevalence of OCD and the rate among controls. Relatives of adults with OCD were approximately two times more likely to be affected than the controls, while relatives of children and adolescents with OCD were about ten times more likely to have OCD as well. However, that familial association could also have been caused by cultural or environmental factors. Currently, there have been very few studies investigating the environmental factors behind OCD. However, in a retrospective study of environmental risk factors, researchers found that prolonged labor and edema during pregnancy were correlated to OCD, suggesting that the environment plays some role in determining its manifestation.

As a result, twin studies were performed to show that the symptoms of OCD are heritable and thus genetically related. Monozygotic, or identical, twins share 100% of their genes, while dizygotic, or fraternal, twins share on average 50% of their genes. The classic twin study compares monozygotic and dizygotic twins. If the monozygotic twins resemble each other much more closely than the dizygotic twins, then it is likely that genetics play a strong role in the development of the trait of interest. These studies showed that the genetic influences on obsessive–compulsive symptoms were 45–65% in children. The influence was less in adults, ranging from 27 to 47%. However, the results of the studies are complicated by the fact that the presence of individuals with OCD in the sample were frequently low. As a result, researchers oftentimes included individuals with obsessive–compulsive symptoms or subclinical OCD. By doing so, they possibly included subjects with other, related disorders. Early twin studies were replicated later using twins with OCD meeting DSM criteria and ascertainment of probands, but only a few have been performed.

=== Early onset OCD ===
Early onset OCD, manifesting in childhood or adolescence, is a subtype of OCD etiologically distinct from adult onset OCD. This early onset OCD is reported to be genetically related to tic disorders and Tourette syndrome, as one study has found that patients with early onset OCD have a higher rate of Tourette's and other tic disorders. Family association studies have suggested that early onset OCD is correlated to increased familial and possibly genetic risk. The rate of OCD and subclinical OCD among relatives of probands whose OCD manifested in childhood or adolescence was at least twice as high as the rate among relatives of probands whose OCD manifested in adulthood. Other studies have also indicated that there is an inverse relationship between the age of onset of the proband and the risk of OCD in relatives. GWAS studies suggest that due to the nature of childhood disorders consisting of multiple small effects originating from multiple genes, OCD is considered a polygenic disorder. Consequently, it is possible that there are different genetic mechanisms behind the two types of OCD; therefore, it may be necessary to control for age of onset when examining candidate genes.

=== Candidate gene SLC1A1 ===
It is likely that a number of genes are important to the development of OCD. Some of those candidate genes have been identified but none of the candidate gene studies have been consistently replicated except those relating to the glutamate transporter gene, SLC1A1 (solute carrier family 1, member 1), which codes for the glutamate transporter, EAAC1. It has been suggested that the difficulties in identifying candidate genes may be related to the fact that most gene research has ignored environmental factors.[9] Consequently, it may be necessary to develop models for the interaction between genetic and environmental factors for certain subtypes of OCD to further genetic research. Three genome-wide association studies of OCD have also been completed, which have suggested potential regions of interest, including the region containing SLC1A1, 9p24. SLC1A1 is expressed in the cortex, striatum, and thalamus (the cortico-striato-thalamocortical circuit) and is related to glutamate neurotransmission. Neuroimaging, candidate gene, and animal model studies have provided evidence linking SLC1A1 and glutamate signaling to the occurrence of OCD. Neuroimaging studies have found that caudate glutamatergic concentrations are lower in the anterior cingulate and higher in the caudate in early onset OCD patients compared to controls, suggesting that glutamate transport (and in turn, the glutamate transporter gene SLC1A1) is related to the onset of OCD.

Single nucleotide polymorphisms (SNPs) in the gene SLC1A1 have consistently been found to be related to OCD. In addition to glutamate transport, EAAC1, the transporter coded by SLC1A1, has also been linked to GABA synthesis, which could promote susceptibility to OCD. An initial study demonstrated a significant association between OCD and three linked polymorphisms in the SLC1A1 gene. This result has been replicated in numerous studies. One study tested for four SNPs in the SLC1A1 gene in individuals with early-onset OCD in a Han Chinese population and found that one SNP, rs10491734, was significantly more frequent in OCD patients than in controls. However, the exact SNPs identified in the different studies vary, though it is possible that this is because the studies were conducted on different ethnic populations. For example, a family-based association study analyzed the instances of SNPs in and around SLC1A1 in families from throughout the US and found that a different SNP, rs4740788, and a 3-SNP haplotype, rs4740788-rs10491734-rs10491733, were both related to OCD.

Several mouse models have been developed for the study of obsessive–compulsive disorder. Model organisms are useful for allowing aspects of some psychiatric disorders in one species (in this case, humans) to be explored in other species (in this case, mice). Notably, SLC1A1 null mice demonstrated compulsive behaviors by exhibiting increased aggression and excessive self-grooming resulting in fur loss. However, since these were only two behaviors loosely linked to OCD, this did not provide strong evidence for the relation between the loss of EAAC1 and OCD-like behaviors. Given the strong correlation between the gene SLC1A1 and OCD, this suggests that the lack of EAAC1 only results in OCD-like behaviors when it is combined with other rare mutations in genes related to the CSTC, or cortico-striato-thalamocortical, circuit.

== Neuroethology ==
The vast monolith of psychiatric research has placed an emphasis on proximate mechanisms as the cause for illness. In contrast, evolutionary theory has engendered questions regarding how distal mechanisms may be implicated with pathogenesis. OCD involves several behavioral schemata that may have been preserved over evolutionary history. Numerous species have inherited cognitive patterns that lend to checking for danger, avoiding contamination, and hoarding food. Theorists have hypothesized that a dysfunction in any of these strategies could lead to the expression of OCD. This conjecture is further supported by evidence that such inherited, species-specific strategies are stored in the basal ganglia.

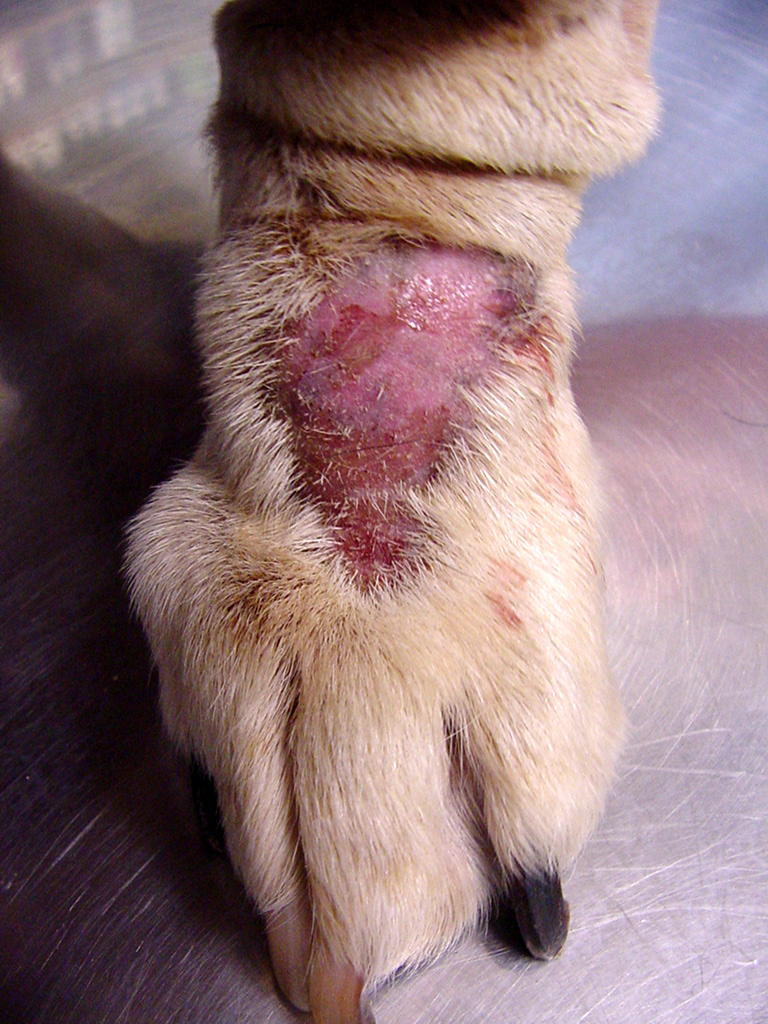
Lick granuloma from excessive licking

When considering the expression of OCD in non-human species, researchers have studied acral lick dermatitis (also known as lick granuloma) in large canines. This disorder is characterized by excessive licking or scratching that leads to alopecia (hair loss) and subsequent granulomatous lesions (vascular tissue on the surface of a wound). Rapoport et al. found that this obsessive-compulsive behavior was alleviated in canines after administering clomipramine. Thus, it is conceivable that evolutionary selected traits could become maladaptive proceeding neurological dysfunction.
