= Brodmann area 7 =

Brain area

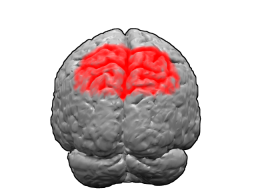
- Image of brain with Brodmann area 7 shown in red

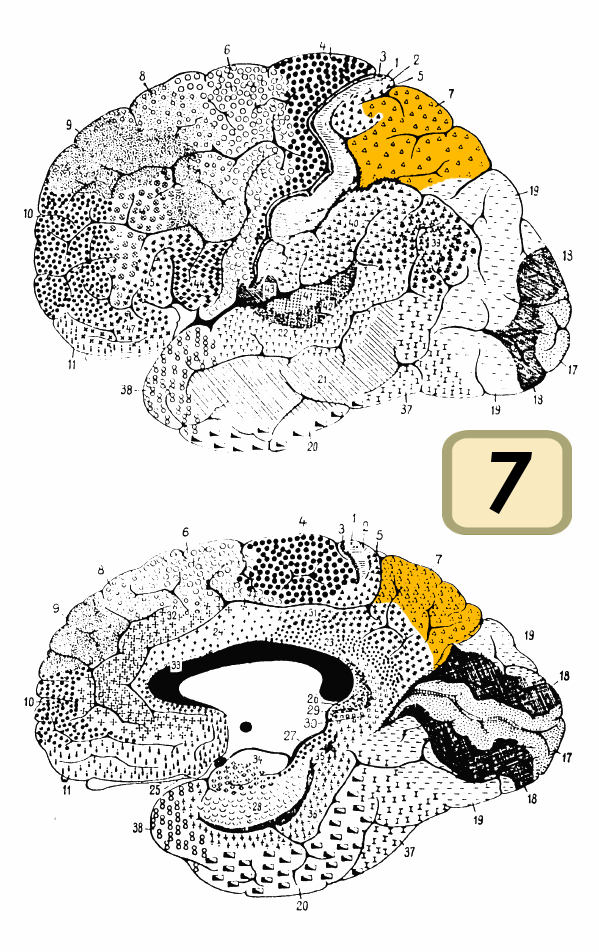
- Image of brain with Brodmann area 7 shown in yellow

Details

Identifiers
- Latin: area parietalis superior
- NeuroNames: 85
- NeuroLex ID: birnlex_1738
- FMA: 68604

Brodmann area 7 is one of Brodmann's cytologically defined regions of the brain corresponding to precuneus and superior parietal lobule (SPL). It is involved in locating objects in space. It serves as a point of convergence between vision and proprioception to determine where objects are in relation to parts of the body.

== In humans ==
Brodmann area 7 is part of the parietal cortex in the human brain. Situated posterior to the primary somatosensory cortex (Brodmann areas 3, 1 and 2), and superior to the occipital lobe, this region is believed to play a role in visuo-motor coordination (e.g., in reaching to grasp an object). In addition, area 7 along with area 5 has been linked to a wide variety of high-level processing tasks, including activation in association with language use. This function in language has been theorized to stem from how these two regions play a vital role in generating conscious constructs of objects in the world.

Brodmann area 7 spans both the medial and lateral walls of the parietal cortex. The medial part of Brodmann area 7 is called precuneus. Laterally, it is called the superior parietal lobule (SPL). At the base of the SPL is the intraparietal sulcus, below which is the inferior parietal lobule (IPL), which in turn divides into Brodmann areas 39 (angular gyrus) and 40 (supramarginal gyrus).

== In guenon ==
Brodmann area 7 is a subdivision of the cytoarchitecturally defined parietal region of cerebral cortex in Guenon primates. It occupies most of the parietal lobe excluding the postcentral gyrus and superior parietal lobule. This layer is distinguished by a lack of large ganglion cells in cortical layer V, slightly larger layer III pyramidal cells, and a multiform layer VI that is sharply bounded by white matter tracts.

== See also ==
- Brodmann area
- Korbinian Brodmann
- List of regions in the human brain
- Precuneus
