= Postcentral sulcus =

Anatomical furrow of the brain

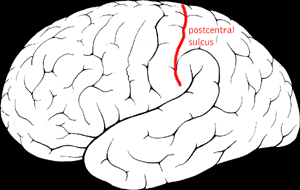
- Postcentral sulcus of the human brain.

- Lateral surface of left cerebral hemisphere, viewed from the side.

Details

Identifiers
- Latin: sulcus postcentralis
- NeuroNames: 99
- NeuroLex ID: birnlex_4033
- TA98: A14.1.09.129
- TA2: 5470
- FMA: 83774

The postcentral sulcus of the parietal lobe lies parallel to, and behind, the central sulcus in the human brain. (A sulcus is one of the prominent grooves on the surface of the brain.)

The postcentral sulcus divides the postcentral gyrus from the remainder of the parietal lobe.

== Additional images ==
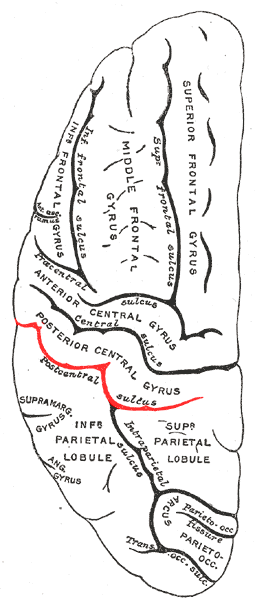
Lateral surface of left cerebral hemisphere, viewed from above.

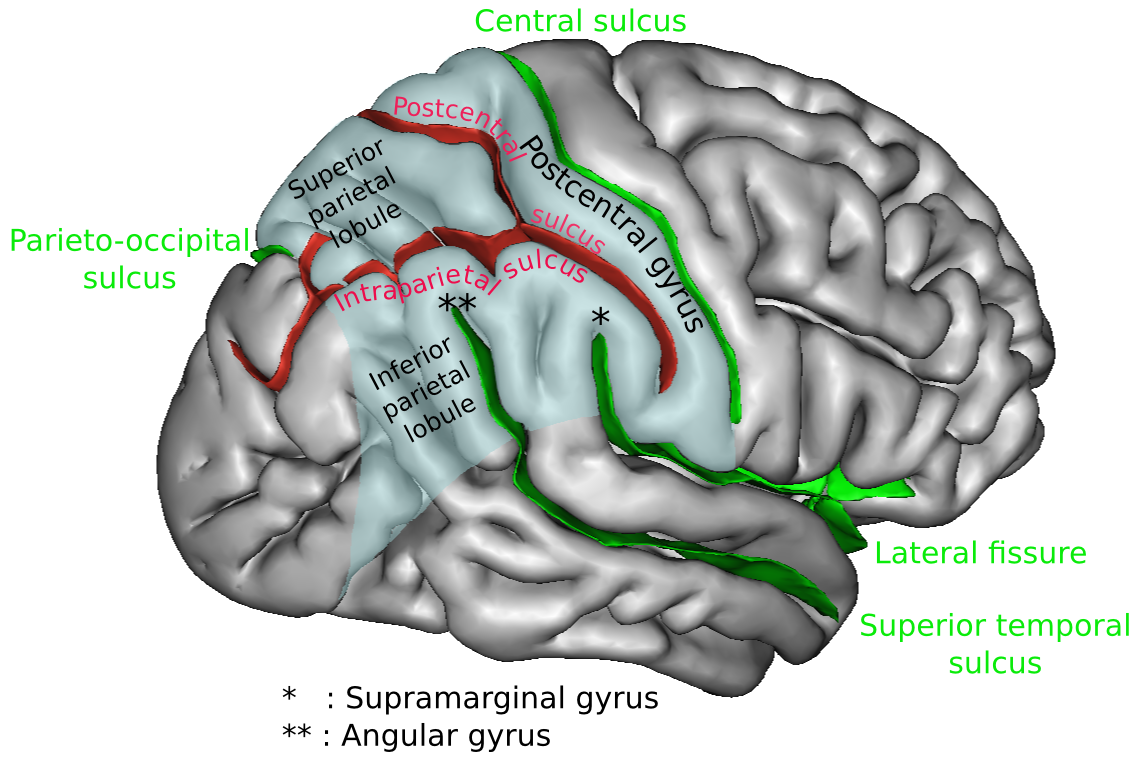
Gyri and sulci of right cerebral hemisphere. Postcentral sulcus labeled in red at top center.

Human brain dissection video (36 sec). Demonstrating position of the postcentral sulcus of the left cerebral hemisphere.
