= Astereognosis =

- Specialty: Neurology

Astereognosis (or tactile agnosia if only one hand is affected) is the inability to identify an object by active touch of the hands without other sensory input, such as visual or sensory information. An individual with astereognosis is unable to identify objects by handling them, despite intact elementary tactile, proprioceptive, and thermal sensation. With the absence of vision (i.e. eyes closed), an individual with astereognosis is unable to identify what is placed in their hand based on cues such as texture, size, spatial properties, and temperature. As opposed to agnosia, when the object is observed visually, one should be able to successfully identify the object.

Individuals with tactile agnosia may be able to identify the name, purpose, or origin of an object with their left hand but not their right, or vice versa, or both hands. Astereognosis refers specifically to those who lack tactile recognition in both hands. In the affected hand(s) they may be able to identify basic shapes such as pyramids and spheres (with abnormally high difficulty) but still not tactilely recognize common objects by easily recognizable and unique features such as a fork by its prongs (though the individual may report feeling a long, metal rod with multiple, pointy rods stemming off in uniform direction). These symptoms suggest that a very specific part of the brain is responsible for making the connections between tactile stimuli and functions/relationships of those stimuli, which, along with the relatively low impact this disorder has on a person's quality of life, helps explain the rarity of reports and research of individuals with tactile agnosia.

Astereognosis is associated with lesions of the parietal lobe or dorsal column or parieto-temporo-occipital lobe (posterior association areas) of either the right or left hemisphere of the cerebral cortex. Despite cross-talk between the dorsal and ventral cortices, fMRI results suggest that those with ventral cortex damage are less sensitive to object 3D structure than those with dorsal cortex damage. Unlike the ventral cortex, the dorsal cortex can compute object representations. Thus, those with object recognition impairments are more likely to have acquired damage to the dorsal cortex.

While astereognosis is characterized by the lack of tactile recognition in both hands, it seems to be closely related to tactile agnosia (impairment connected to one hand). Tactile agnosia observations are rare and case-specific. Josef Gerstmann recounts his experience with patient JH, a 34-year-old infantryman who suffered a lesion to the posterior parietal lobe due to a gunshot. Following the injury, JH was unable to recognize or identify everyday objects by their meaning, origin, purpose and use with his left hand using tactile sensation alone. His motility performance, elementary sensitivity, and speech were intact, and he lacked abnormalities in brain nerves.

The majority of all objects JH touched with his left hand went unrecognized, but very simple objects (i.e. globes, pyramids, cube, etc.) were regularly recognized based on form alone. For more complex objects, his behavior and recognition varied daily based on his tactile resources that changed over time and depended on his fatigue. That is, JH’s ability to recognize depended on his concentration and ability to recognize simple forms and single qualities like size, shape, etc. With further interrogation and greater effort, he was able to correctly identify more specific features of an object (i.e. softness, rounded or cornered, broad or narrow) and could even draw a copy of it, but he was often left unable to identify the object by name, use, or origin. This behavioral deficit occurred even if JH had handled the object in his fully intact right hand.

Interventions tend to focus on helping these patients and their family and caregivers cope and adapt to the condition, and furthermore, to help patients function independently within their context.
