= Postcentral gyrus =

Region of the parietal lobe of the brain

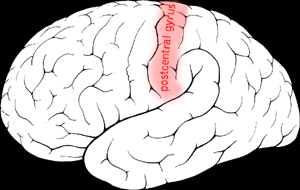
- Postcentral gyrus of the human brain

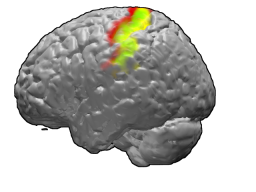
- Brodmann areas 3, 1, and 2 of human brain. Brodmann area 3 is in red, area 1 in green, and area 2 in yellow.

Details
- System: Somatosensory system
- Location: Parietal lobe
- Artery: Middle cerebral artery
- Function: Primary somatosensory cortex

Identifiers
- Latin: gyrus postcentralis
- NeuroNames: 105
- NeuroLex ID: birnlex_1070
- TA98: A14.1.09.128
- TA2: 5469
- FMA: 61896

In neuroanatomy, the postcentral gyrus is a prominent gyrus in the lateral parietal lobe of the human brain. It is the location of the primary somatosensory cortex, the main sensory receptive area for the sense of touch. Like other sensory areas, there is a map of sensory space in this location, called the sensory homunculus.

The primary somatosensory cortex was initially defined from surface stimulation studies of Wilder Penfield, and parallel surface potential studies of Bard, Woolsey, and Marshall. Although initially defined to be roughly the same as Brodmann areas 3, 1, and 2, more recent work by Kaas has suggested that for homogeny with other sensory fields only area 3 should be referred to as "primary somatosensory cortex", as it receives the bulk of the thalamocortical projections from the sensory input fields.

== Structure ==
The lateral postcentral gyrus is bounded by:

- medial longitudinal fissure medially (to the middle)
- central sulcus rostrally (in front)
- postcentral sulcus caudally (in back)
- lateral sulcus inferiorly (underneath)

The postcentral gyrus includes Brodmann areas 1, 2, and 3. Brodmann area 1 occupies the apex of the postcentral gyrus.

== See also ==
- List of regions in the human brain

== Additional images ==
Postcentral gyrus (animation)

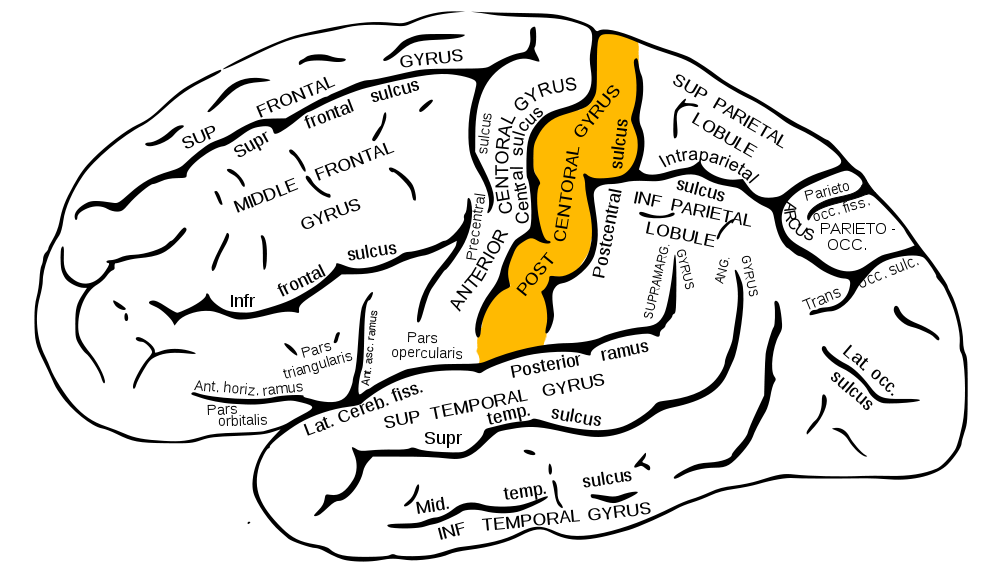
Lateral surface of left cerebral hemisphere, viewed from the side.

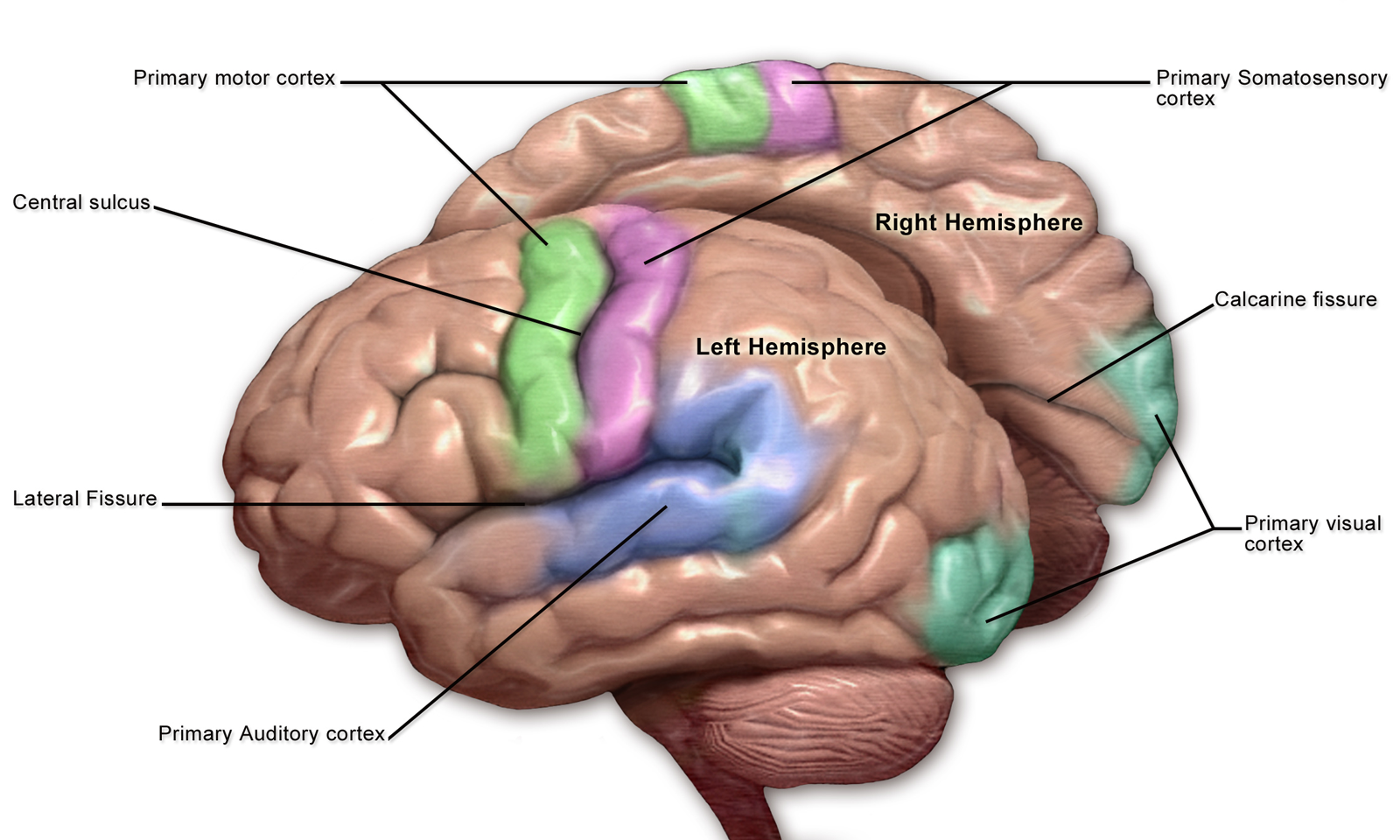
Primary cortices, including primary somatosensory cortex (labeled in purple)

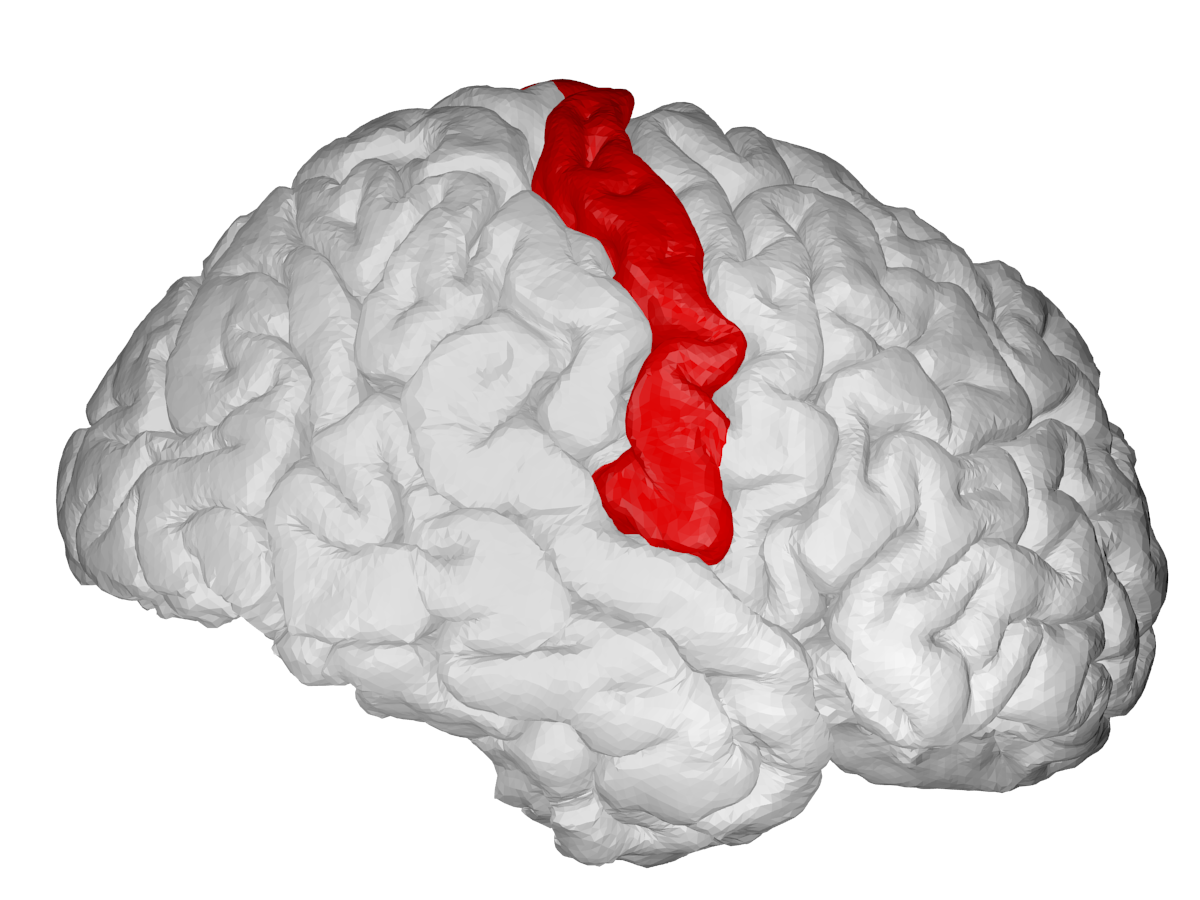
Postcentral gyrus, showed on the right hemisphere.

Postcentral gyrus highlighted in green on coronal T1 MRI images

Postcentral gyrus highlighted in green on sagittal T1 MRI images

Postcentral gyrus highlighted in green on transversal T1 MRI images
