= Auditosensory cortex =

The auditosensory cortex is the part of the auditory system that is associated with the sense of hearing in humans. It occupies the bilateral primary auditory cortex in the temporal lobe of the mammalian brain. The term is used to describe Brodmann areas 41 and 42 together with the transverse temporal gyrus. The auditosensory cortex takes part in the reception and processing of auditory nerve impulses, which passes sound information from the thalamus to the brain. Abnormalities in this region are responsible for many disorders in auditory abilities, such as congenital deafness, true cortical deafness, primary progressive aphasia and auditory hallucination.

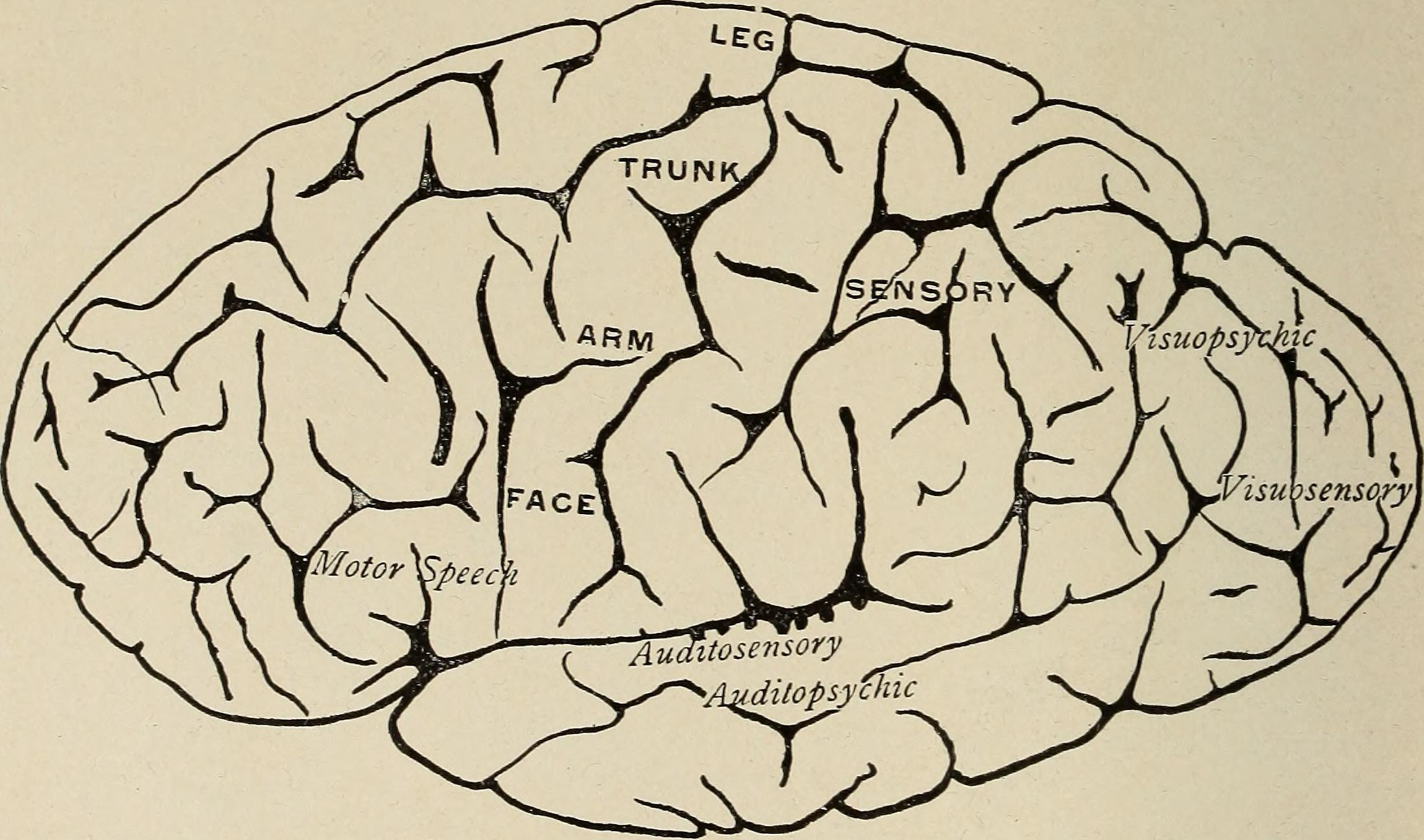
Lateral view of the human cerebrum showing the location of auditosensory cortex.

== History ==
The auditosensory cortex defines Brodmann area 42, which is part of the primary auditory cortex. It is also known as the posterior transverse temporal area, located superiorly within the temporal lobe of the cerebral cortex. The cortical area has been studied in a variety of mammals, including humans. It is a functional region found to serve essential roles in hearing.

Previous studies by Richard Ladislaus Heschl first revealed the anatomical features of this cortical region in 1878. Heschl found a cortical structure that appeared differently from most of the temporal lobe. The distinct structure occupied Brodmann area 42 and was later named the transverse temporal gyri of Heschl. The discovery provided insight into the anatomical network within the primary cortex. It is the first site to process incoming sound information. Due to the close correspondence, Brodmann area 42 is also referred to as Heschl's gyrus.

Mapped by German neurologist Korbinian Brodmann in 1909, the auditosensory cortex is one of the 52 cortical regions identified in the cerebral cortex according to their histological characteristics, density, shape, distribution and cell body size. These subdivided cortical regions are later known as the Brodmann areas. Brodmann was the pioneer of cerebral cortex mapping. He grouped several cortical regions based on their nervous function, two of which are areas 41 and 42 for auditory processing. It has been suggested that Brodmann area 42 is a homotypical acoustic association area.

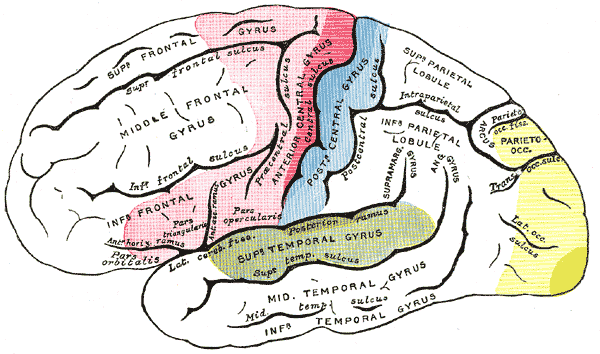
Section of brain showing the position of the human temporal lobe. The brain functional areas are highlighted above, with the auditory area in green.

== Structure ==
=== Anatomical position ===
The primary auditory cortex lies medially in the superior temporal gyrus of the human brain. It is responsible for receiving signals from the medial geniculate nucleus. Within the primary auditory cortex, the auditosensory cortex extends posteromedially over the gyrus. Brodmann area 42 is an auditory core region bordered medially by Brodmann area 41 and laterally by Brodmann area 22. The auditosensory cortex demarcates the lateral edge of Brodmann area 41.

=== Relationship to the transverse temporal gyri ===
The auditosensory cortex is a differentiated anatomical area within the posterior-medial field of the transverse temporal gyrus of Heschl in the lateral sulcus. The cortex of transverse temporal gyrus of Heschl forms a homogeneous structural region with Brodmann area 22. In contrast to other temporal lobe gyri, the transverse temporal gyrus has a distinct feature of stretching mediolaterally towards the brain centre.

== Function ==
The main and most apparent function of the auditosensory cortex is hearing. Hearing is a sense of sound reception and perception. Sound reception is the receiving of sound stimuli. The sound wave is transmitted to our auditory apparatus from external environment. This sensory signal is then converted to an electrical signal in a process called sensory transduction. This electrical impulse is carried from the inner ear to the brainstem via the vestibulocochlear nerve (cranial nerve XIII). Furthermore, the auditory impulse is recognised, organised and interpreted as sensory information. The different properties of sound waves are necessary to help the comprehension of language and sound. The language competence directly correlates with the ability of auditosensory cortex in terms of strength and frequency of neuronal activity.

=== Reception and perception of auditory nerve impulses ===
The primary auditory cortex includes the auditosensory cortex (Brodmann area 42) and the auditopsychic cortex (Brodmann area 41). The primary function of the auditosensory cortex is the sense of hearing. It is the initial cortical destination of auditory nerve impulses from the thalamus. The characteristics of neural activities in this cortex correspond with the physical properties of sound waves.

The perception of auditory signals came as a nervous impulse from the inner ear to the cochlear nuclei of the brainstem, which is the first relay station. In an ascending pathway, various acoustic reflexes and sound localisation are regulated via relay stations. The impulse reaches the auditory cortical projections on the superior temporal gyrus, which is the auditosensory cortex. This is the first site of unprocessed recognition of sound. The impulse propagates across the auditosensory area, the auditopsychic area and eventually the entire temporal lobe. Therefore, this allows the formation of memory and comprehension of sound to take place. The posterior auditopsychic region has a site especially for an understanding of speech called the Wernicke's area (Brodmann area 22).

The auditosensory cortex solely is insufficient for the complete production and reception of language. The subcortical structures, such as the thalamus, are necessary for controlling emotional and cognitive integration, and the cerebellum for coordinating movements.

=== Analysis of sound properties ===
The auditosensory cortex can analyse acrostic characteristics, namely pitch, loudness and timbre. A higher frequency gives a higher pitch, whereas a lower frequency gives a lower pitch. A larger amplitude gives a higher volume, on the contrary, a smaller amplitude gives a lower volume. Amplitude is for determination of intensity. Timbre is the characteristic of a tone to distinguish sound with the same pitch and volume. Factors affecting timbre are the harmonics, vibration and envelope of the wave.

The transverse temporal gyrus, which contains the auditosensory cortex, processes sound impulse in low frequency. Its lateral aspect maps the sound impulse in a tonotopic organisation that produces a mirror image of spatial gradients of frequency sensitivity. It depends on the duration and intensity of the sound stimuli.

The early processing of speech recognition requires the ability of the transverse temporal gyrus to discriminate frequency. Hence, this region can distinguish phonetic characteristics of sound. The responsiveness to prosody corresponds to the sensitivity to the slight variation of frequency and duration of time.

=== Linguistic competence ===
Language competence is acquired from the ability of the auditosensory cortex to interpret sound stimuli. The information processing pathway in the transverse temporal gyrus is necessary for recognizing and comprehending speech, and has been referred to as the two-streams hypothesis. The ventral pathway is responsible for processing linguistic semantic information that allows the understanding of meaning. The dorsal stream is responsible for processing phonological information that forms the structure of language.

Neuroplasticity includes our auditory perception. It can be shaped by stimuli from the environment, memory and attentional factors. Neural activities in other brain areas are closely bound up with auditosensory processing in the transverse temporal gyrus. For instance, attention and focus, and face perception have an emphasis on our language competence.

== Clinical significance ==
There is a strong association between the cerebral cortex and auditory function. Animal studies have shown that extirpation of the auditosensory cortex leads to the loss of responsiveness to previously learnt tones. The locations of auditory cortical neurones and conformations of the primary auditory cortex are unique to every individual. Therefore, any surgical procedure should take these anatomical variations into account to minimise the damage to our auditory and language functions. Functional brain mapping (FBM) is one of the pre-operative procedures.

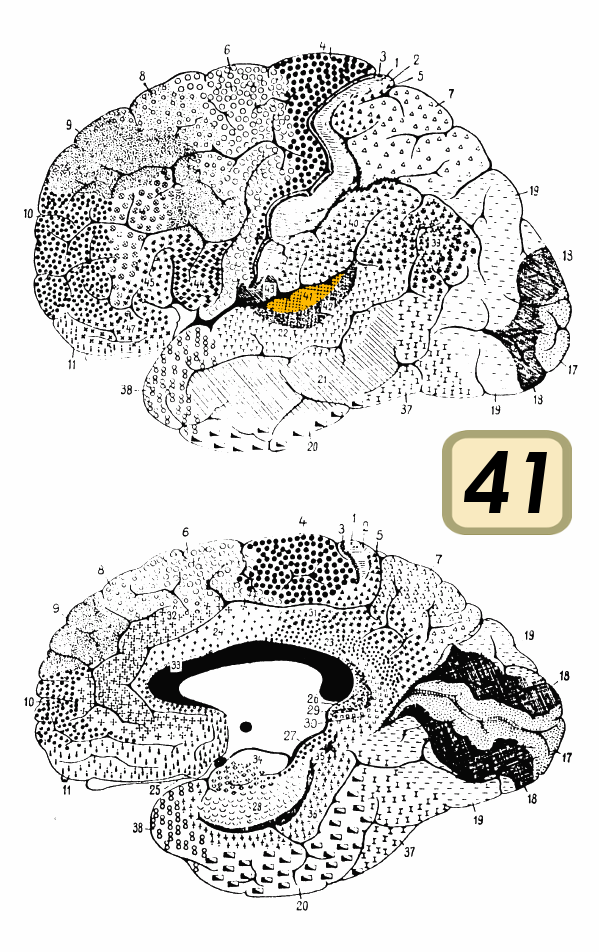
Cytoarchitectonics of Brodmann 41 (Auditosensory cortex)

=== Congenital deafness ===
Congenital deafness is the loss of hearing present at birth. The primary auditory cortex is never stimulated by auditory signals in these patients. This condition also affects the development of the auditory cortex, which gives rise to auditory functional deficits. There are fewer nerve fibres and less myelination in patients' primary auditory cortex, illustrated by the higher grey matter-to-white matter ratios in the Heschl gyrus. The cells and synapses undergo dystrophy in a deafness auditory pathway. If the infants receive cochlear implants during the early critical period, the neurosensory functions can be restored. A recent study concluded that congenital deafness does not damage the general cortical cytoarchitecture. However, there is anatomical dystrophy of deep layers over higher-order cortical fields. The sensory deprivation of auditory neurones induces dystrophy beyond the primary auditory cortex, namely the dorsal zone of the auditory cortex (DZ) and secondary auditory cortex (A2).

=== True cortical deafness ===
Cortical deafness is characterised by the unresponsiveness to both verbal and nonverbal sounds due to cortical lesions. However, this sensorineural hearing loss shows no damage to the auditory pathway from the cochlea to the upper brainstem. The onset is usually during childhood, where they have severely impaired ability to distinguish the different vowels and consonant sounds, and impaired capability to comprehend auditory information. They have no subjective experience of hearing as they are unable to process acoustic impulse. They may learn how to identify the meaning of nonverbal sounds correctly.

=== Primary progressive aphasia ===
Primary progressive aphasia is characterised by the progressive impairment of speech production, comprehension and communication. It is secondary to neurodegenerative diseases, for instance, Alzheimer's disease and frontotemporal lobar degeneration. The Heschl gyrus undergoes deterioration, as shown by the low activity of the primary auditory cortex after stimulation. The symptoms are difficulty and delay in communication and speech organisation. The patients may become reluctant to communicate or even unable to understand verbal or written language, eventually causing primary progressive aphasia.

=== Auditory impairment in concussion ===
Difficulty in auditory processing is a complication of concussion that may result in a reduced activation of the primary auditory cortex, as shown by fMRI. The neural communication of the left and right primary auditory cortices are poorly transmitted. As a result, the lateralisation and responsiveness of the cerebral cortex are affected. The temporal fine structure processing has degenerated as presented by the reduced temporal resolution. It is often due to diffuse axonal injury and demyelination. There may be peripheral and central symptoms, such as reduced auditory understanding in a complex listening environment, central auditory processing disorder and auditory hallucination. Hyperacusis, that is the hypersensitivity to environmental noise can also develop.

=== Auditory hallucination in schizophrenia ===
Auditory hallucination is one of the major symptoms displayed in schizophrenia. Studies supported by functional imaging and electrophysiology have shown a possible correlation between the auditory cortex and auditory hallucinations. In the case of an average individual, speaking-induced suppression is generated due to speaking to reduce the activity in the primary auditory cortex. This acts as a physiological mechanism in the auditory system for the speaker to be more focused on the sounds externally produced.

However, this is not demonstrated in individuals with schizophrenia, in contrast, there is an increased activity in the auditory cortex instead of sound suppression. Even in a silent environment without external auditory stimuli, there tends to be abnormal activation of the auditory cortex, leading to auditory hallucinations. The volume of the auditory cortex in those with schizophrenia is much smaller.

== See also ==
- Noise health effects
