= Operculum (brain) =

Part of the anatomy of the brain

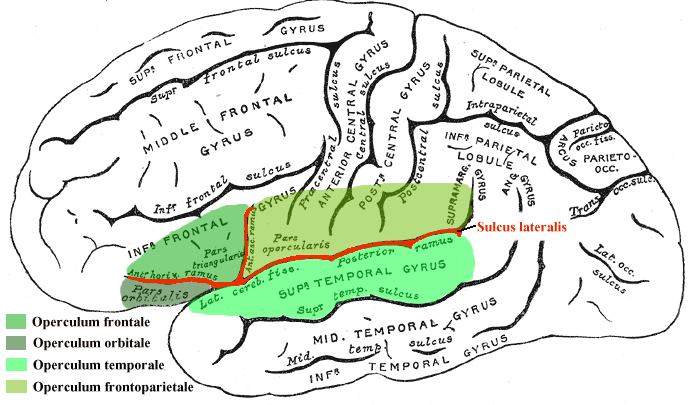
- Operculum

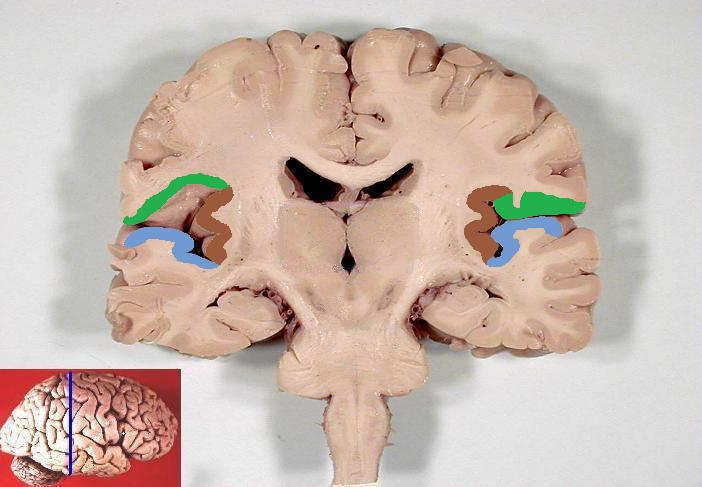
- Parietal operculum (green), temporal operculum (blue), and insular cortex (brown), with red inset showing the position of the brain slice.

Details

Identifiers
- Latin: operculum frontale, operculum parietale, operculum temporale

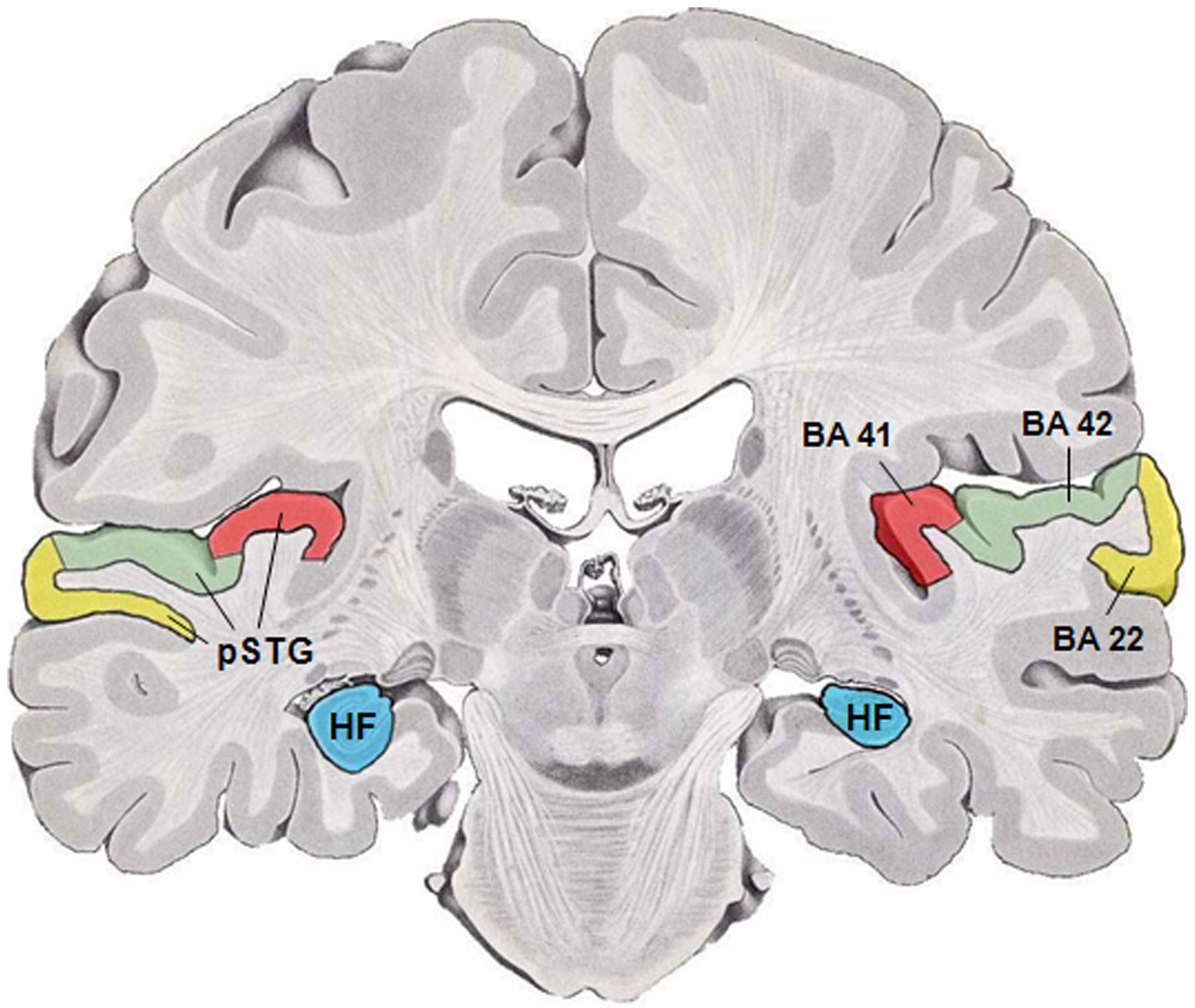
red:Brodmann area 41, green:Brodmann area 42, note 1: BA41 is bounded medially by Brodmann area 52 and laterally by BA42, note 2: pSTG is posterior part of the superior temporal gyrus

In human brain anatomy, an operculum (Latin, meaning "little lid") (pl.: opercula), may refer to the frontal, temporal, or parietal operculum, which together cover the insula as the opercula of insula. It can also refer to the occipital operculum, part of the occipital lobe.

The insular lobe is a portion of the cerebral cortex that has invaginated to lie deep within the lateral sulcus. It sits like an island (the meaning of insular) almost surrounded by the groove of the circular sulcus and covered over and obscured by the insular opercula.

A part of the parietal lobe, the frontoparietal operculum, covers the upper part of the insular lobe from the front to the back. The opercula lie on the precentral and postcentral gyri (on either side of the central sulcus). The part of the parietal operculum that forms the ceiling of the lateral sulcus functions as the secondary somatosensory cortex.

== Development ==
Normally, the insular opercula begin to develop between the 20th and the 22nd weeks of pregnancy. At weeks 14 to 16 of fetal development, the insula begins to invaginate from the surface of the immature cerebrum of the brain, until at full term, the opercula completely cover the insula. This process is called opercularization.

== Case reports ==
=== Albert Einstein's brain ===
Opinions differ on whether Albert Einstein's brain possessed parietal opercula. Falk, et al. claim that the brain actually did have parietal opercula, while Witelson et al. claim that it did not.

Einstein's lower parietal lobe (which is involved in mathematical thought, visuospatial cognition and imagery of movement) was 15% larger than average.

== See also ==
- Circular sulcus of insula
- Sulcus lateralis
