= Auditory agnosia =

Inability to distinguish sounds

Auditory agnosia is a form of agnosia that manifests itself primarily in the inability to recognize or differentiate between sounds. It is not a defect of the ear or "hearing", but rather a neurological inability of the brain to process sound meaning. While auditory agnosia impairs the understanding of sounds, other abilities such as reading, writing, and speaking are not hindered. It is caused by bilateral damage to the anterior superior temporal gyrus, which is part of the auditory pathway responsible for sound recognition, the auditory "what" pathway.

Persons with auditory agnosia can physically hear the sounds and describe them using unrelated terms, but are unable to recognize them. They might describe the sound of some environmental sounds, such as a motor starting, as resembling a lion roaring, but would not be able to associate the sound with "car" or "engine", nor would they say that it was a lion creating the noise. All auditory agnosia patients read lips in order to enhance the speech comprehension.

It is yet unclear whether auditory agnosia (also called general auditory agnosia) is a combination of milder disorders, such auditory verbal agnosia (pure word deafness), non-verbal auditory agnosia, amusia and word-meaning deafness, or a mild case of the more severe disorder, cerebral deafness. Typically, a person with auditory agnosia would be incapable of comprehending spoken language as well as environmental sounds. Some may say that the milder disorders are how auditory agnosia occurs. There are few cases where a person may not be able to understand spoken language. This is called verbal auditory agnosia or pure word deafness. Nonverbal auditory agnosia is diagnosed when a person's understanding of environmental sounds is inhibited. Combined, these two disorders portray auditory agnosia. The blurriness between the combination of these disorders may lead to discrepancies in reporting. As of 2014, 203 patients with auditory perceptual deficits due to CNS damage were reported in the medical literature, of which 183 diagnosed with general auditory agnosia or word deafness, 34 with cerebral deafness, 51 with non-verbal auditory agnosia-amusia and 8 word meaning deafness (for a list of patients see).

== History ==
A relationship between hearing and the brain was first documented by Ambroise Paré, a 16th-century battlefield doctor, who associated parietal lobe damage with acquired deafness (reported in Henschen, 1918). Systematic research into the manner in which the brain processes sounds, however, only began toward the end of the 19th century. In 1874, Wernicke was the first to ascribe to a brain region a role in auditory perception. Wernicke proposed that the impaired perception of language in his patients was due to losing the ability to register sound frequencies that are specific to spoken words (he also suggested that other aphasic symptoms, such as speaking, reading and writing errors occur because these speech specific frequencies are required for feedback). Wernicke localized the perception of spoken words to the posterior half of the left STG (superior temporal gyrus). Wernicke also distinguished between patients with auditory agnosia (which he labels as receptive aphasia) with patients who cannot detect sound at any frequency (which he labels as cortical deafness).

In 1877, Kussmaul was the first to report auditory agnosia in a patient with intact hearing, speaking, and reading-writing abilities. This case-study led Kussmaul to propose of distinction between the word perception deficit and Wernicke's sensory aphasia. He coined the former disorder as "word deafness". Kussmaul also localized this disorder to the left STG. Wernicke interpreted Kussmaul's case as an incomplete variant of his sensory aphasia.

In 1885, Lichtheim also reported of an auditory agnosia patient. This patient, in addition to word deafness, was impaired at recognizing environmental sounds and melodies. Based on this case study, as well as other aphasic patients, Lichtheim proposed that the language reception center receives afferents from upstream auditory and visual word recognition centers, and that damage to these regions results in word deafness or word blindness (i.e., alexia), respectively. Because the lesion of Lichtheim's auditory agnosia patient was sub-cortical deep to the posterior STG (superior temporal gyrus), Lichtheim renamed auditory agnosia as "sub-cortical speech deafness".

The language model proposed by Wernicke and Lichtheim wasn't accepted at first. For example, in 1897 Bastian argued that, because aphasic patients can repeat single words, their deficit is in the extraction of meaning from words. He attributed both aphasia and auditory agnosia to damage in Lichtheim's auditory word center. He hypothesized that aphasia is the outcome of partial damage to the left auditory word center, whereas auditory agnosia is the result of complete damage to the same area. Bastian localized the auditory word center to the posterior MTG (middle temporal gyrus).

Other opponents to the Wernicke-Lichtheim model were Sigmund Freud and Carl Freund. Freud (1891) suspected that the auditory deficits in aphasic patients was due to a secondary lesion to cochlea. This assertion was confirmed by Freund (1895), who reported two auditory agnosia patients with cochlear damage (although in a later autopsy, Freund reported also the presence of a tumor in the left STG in one of these patients). This argument, however, was refuted by Bonvicini (1905), who measured the hearing of an auditory agnosia patient with tuning forks, and confirmed intact pure tone perception. Similarly, Barrett's aphasic patient, who was incapable of comprehending speech, had intact hearing thresholds when examined with tuning forks and with a Galton whistle. The most adverse opponent to the model of Wernicke and Lichtheim was Marie (1906), who argued that all aphasic symptoms manifest because of a single lesion to the language reception center, and that other symptoms such as auditory disturbances or paraphasia are expressed because the lesion encompasses also sub-cortical motor or sensory regions.

In the following years, increasing number of clinical reports validated the view that the right and left auditory cortices project to a language reception center located in the posterior half of the left STG, and thus established the Wernicke-Lichtheim model. This view was also consolidated by Geschwind (1965) who reported that, in humans, the left planum temporale is larger in the left hemisphere than on the right. Geschwind interpreted this asymmetry as anatomical verification for the role of left posterior STG in the perception of language.

The Wernicke-Lichtheim-Geschwind model persisted throughout the 20th century. However, with the advent of MRI and its usage for lesion mapping, it was shown that this model is based on incorrect correlation between symptoms and lesions. Although this model is considered outdated, it is still widely mentioned in Psychology and medical textbooks, and consequently in medical reports of auditory agnosia patients. As will be mentioned below, based on cumulative evidence the process of sound recognition was recently shifted to the left and right anterior auditory cortices, instead of the left posterior auditory cortex.

== Related disorders ==
After auditory agnosia was first discovered, subsequent patients were diagnosed with different types of hearing impairments. In some reports, the deficit was restricted to spoken words, environmental sounds or music. In one case study, each of the three sound types (music, environmental sounds, speech) was also shown to recover independently (Mendez and Geehan, 1988-case 2). It is yet unclear whether general auditory agnosia is a combination of milder auditory disorders, or whether the source of this disorder is at an earlier auditory processing stage.

=== Cerebral deafness ===
Cerebral deafness (also known as cortical deafness or central deafness) is a disorder characterized by complete deafness that is the result of damage to the central nervous system. The primary distinction between auditory agnosia and cerebral deafness is the ability to detect pure tones, as measured with pure tone audiometry. Using this test, auditory agnosia patients were often reported capable of detecting pure tones almost as good as healthy individuals, whereas cerebral deafness patients found this task almost impossible or they required very loud presentations of sounds (above 100 dB). In all reported cases, cerebral deafness was associated with bilateral temporal lobe lesions. A study that compared the lesions of two cerebral deafness patients to an auditory agnosia patient concluded that cerebral deafness is the result of complete de-afferentation of the auditory cortices, whereas in auditory agnosia some thalamo-cortical fibers are spared. In most cases the disorder is transient and the symptoms mitigate into auditory agnosia (although chronic cases were reported). Similarly, a monkey study that ablated both auditory cortices of monkeys reported of deafness that lasted 1 week in all cases, and that was gradually mitigated into auditory agnosia in a period of 3–7 weeks.

=== Pure word deafness ===
Since the early days of aphasia research, the relationship between auditory agnosia and speech perception has been debated. Lichtheim (1885) proposed that auditory agnosia is the result of damage to a brain area dedicated to the perception of spoken words, and consequently renamed this disorder from 'word deafness' to 'pure word deafness'. The description of word deafness as being exclusively for words was adopted by the scientific community despite the patient reported by Lichtheim's who also had more general auditory deficits. Some researchers who surveyed the literature, however, argued against labeling this disorder as pure word deafness on the account that all patients reported impaired at perceiving spoken words were also noted with other auditory deficits or aphasic symptoms. In one review of the literature, Ulrich (1978) presented evidence for separation of word deafness from more general auditory agnosia, and suggested naming this disorder "linguistic auditory agnosia" (this name was later rephrased into "verbal auditory agnosia"). To contrast this disorder with auditory agnosia in which speech repetition is intact (word meaning deafness), the name "word sound deafness" and "phonemic deafness" (Kleist, 1962) were also proposed. Although some researchers argued against the purity of word deafness, some anecdotal cases with exclusive impaired perception of speech were documented. On several occasions, patients were reported to gradually transition from pure word deafness to general auditory agnosia/cerebral deafness or recovery from general auditory agnosia/cerebral deafness to pure word deafness.

In a review of the auditory agnosia literature, Phillips and Farmer showed that patients with word deafness are impaired in their ability to discriminate gaps between click sounds as long as 15-50 milliseconds, which is consistent with the duration of phonemes. They also showed that patients with general auditory agnosia are impaired in their ability to discriminate gaps between click sounds as long as 100–300 milliseconds. The authors further showed that word deafness patients liken their auditory experience to hearing foreign language, whereas general auditory agnosia described speech as incomprehensible noise. Based on these findings, and because both word deafness and general auditory agnosia patients were reported to have very similar neuroanatomical damage (bilateral damage to the auditory cortices), the authors concluded that word deafness and general auditory agnosia is the same disorder, but with a different degree of severity.

Pinard et al also suggested that pure word deafness and general auditory agnosia represent different degrees of the same disorder. They suggested that environmental sounds are spared in the mild cases because they are easier to perceive than speech parts. They argued that environmental sounds are more distinct than speech sounds because they are more varied in their duration and loudness. They also proposed that environmental sounds are easier to perceive because they are composed of a repetitive pattern (e.g., the bark of a dog or the siren of the ambulance).

Auerbach et al considered word deafness and general auditory agnosia as two separate disorders, and labelled general auditory agnosia as pre-phonemic auditory agnosia and word deafness as post-phonemic auditory agnosia. They suggested that pre-phonemic auditory agnosia manifests because of general damage to the auditory cortex of both hemispheres, and that post-phonemic auditory agnosia manifests because of damage to a spoken word recognition center in the left hemisphere. A recent research on an epileptic patient supported this hypothesis. The patient undergone electro-stimulation to the anterior superior temporal gyrus, and demonstrated a transient loss of speech comprehension, while preserving intact perception of environmental sounds and music.

=== Non-verbal auditory agnosia ===
The term auditory agnosia was originally coined by Sigmund Freud in 1891, to describe patients with selective impairment of environmental sounds. In a review of the auditory agnosia literature, Ulrich re-named this disorder as non-verbal auditory agnosia (although sound auditory agnosia and environmental sound auditory agnosia are also commonly used). This disorder is very rare and only 18 cases have been documented. In contradiction to pure word deafness and general auditory agnosia, this disorder is likely under-diagnosed because patients are often not aware of their disorder, and thus don't seek medical intervention.

Throughout the 20th century, all reported non-verbal auditory agnosia patients had bilateral or right temporal lobe damage. For this reason, the right hemisphere was traditionally attributed with the perception of environmental sounds. However, Tanaka et al reported 8 patients with non-verbal auditory agnosia, 4 with right hemisphere lesions and 4 with left hemisphere lesions. Saygin et al also reported a patient with damage to the left auditory cortex.

The underlying deficit in non-verbal auditory agnosia appears to be varied. Several patients were characterized by impaired discrimination of pitch whereas others reported with impaired discrimination of timbre and rhythm (discrimination of pitch was relatively preserved in one of these cases). In contrast, to patients with pure word deafness and general auditory agnosia, patients with non-verbal auditory agnosia were reported impaired at discriminating long gaps between click sounds, but impaired at short gaps. A possible neuroanatomical structure that relays longer sound duration was suggested by Tanaka et al. By comparing the lesions of two cortically deaf patients with the lesion of a word deafness patient, they proposed the existence of two thalamocortical pathways that inter-connect the MGN with the auditory cortex. They suggested that spoken words are relayed via a direct thalamocortical pathway that passes underneath the putamen, and that environmental sounds are relayed via a separate thalamocortical pathway that passes above the putamen near the parietal white matter.

=== Amusia ===
Auditory agnosia patients are often impaired in the discrimination of all sounds, including music. However, in two such patients music perception was spared and in one patient music perception was enhanced. The medical literature reports of 33 patients diagnosed with an exclusive deficit for the discrimination and recognition of musical segments (i.e., amusia). The damage in all these cases was localized to the right hemisphere or was bilateral. (with the exception of one case.) The damage in these cases tended to focus around the temporal pole. Consistently, removal of the anterior temporal lobe was also associated with loss of music perception, and recordings directly from the anterior auditory cortex revealed that in both hemispheres, music is perceived medially to speech. These findings therefore imply that the loss of music perception in auditory agnosia is because of damage to the medial anterior STG. In contrast to the association of amusia specific to recognition of melodies (amelodia) with the temporal pole, posterior STG damage was associated with loss of rhythm perception (arryhthmia). Conversely, in two patients rhythm perception was intact, while recognition/discrimination of musical segments was impaired. Amusia also dissociates in regard to enjoyment from music. In two reports, amusic patients, who weren't able to distinguish musical instruments, reported that they still enjoy listening to music. On the other hand, a patient with left hemispheric damage in the amygdala was reported to perceive, but not enjoy, music.

=== Word meaning deafness / associative auditory agnosia ===
In 1928, Kleist suggested that the etiology of word deafness could be due either to impaired perception of the sound (apperceptive auditory agnosia), or to impaired extraction of meaning from a sound (associative auditory agnosia). This hypothesis was first tested by Vignolo et al (1969), who examined unilateral stroke patients. They reported that patients with left hemisphere damage were impaired in matching environmental sounds with their corresponding pictures, whereas patients with right hemisphere damage were impaired in the discrimination of meaningless noise segments. The researchers then concluded that left hemispheric damage results in associative auditory agnosia, and right hemisphere damage results in apperceptive auditory agnosia. Although the conclusion reached by this study could be considered over-reaching, associative auditory agnosia could correspond with the disorder word meaning deafness.

Patients with word meaning deafness are characterized by impaired speech recognition but intact repetition of speech and left hemisphere damage. These patients often repeat words in an attempt to extract its meaning (e.g., "Jar....Jar....what is a jar?"). In the first documented case, Bramwell (1897 - translated by Ellis, 1984) reported a patient, who in order to comprehend speech wrote what she heard and then read her own handwriting. Kohn and Friedman, and Symonds also reported word meaning deafness patients who are able to write to dictation. In at least 12 cases, patients with symptoms that correspond with word meaning deafness were diagnosed as auditory agnosia. Unlike most auditory agnosia patients, word meaning deafness patients are not impaired at discriminating gaps of click sounds. It is yet unclear whether word meaning deafness is also synonymous with the disorder deep dysphasia, in which patients cannot repeat nonsense words and produce semantic paraphasia during repetition of real words. Word meaning deafness is also often confused with transcortical sensory aphasia, but such patients differ from the latter by their ability to express themselves appropriately orally or in writing.

== Neurological mechanism ==
Auditory agnosia (with the exception of non-verbal auditory agnosia and amusia) is strongly dependent on damage to both hemispheres. The order of hemispheric damage is irrelevant to manifestation of symptoms, and years could take between the damage of the first hemisphere and the second hemisphere (after which the symptoms suddenly emerge). A study that compared lesion locations, reported that in all cases with bilateral hemispheric damage, at least in one side the lesion included Heschl's gyrus or its underlying white matter. A rare insight into the etiology of this disorder was reported in a study of an auditory agnosia patient with damage to the brainstem, instead of cortex. fMRI scanning of the patient revealed weak activation of the anterior Heschl's gyrus (area R) and anterior superior temporal gyrus. These brain areas are part of the auditory 'what' pathway, and are known from both human and monkey research to participate in the recognition of sounds.

== See also ==
- Amusia
- Aphasia
- Apraxia
- Auditory verbal agnosia
