= Auditory verbal agnosia =

Inability to comprehend spoken language

Auditory verbal agnosia (AVA), also known as pure word deafness, is the inability to comprehend speech. Individuals with this disorder lose the ability to understand language, repeat words, and write from dictation. Some patients with AVA describe hearing spoken language as meaningless noise, often as though the person speaking was doing so in a foreign language. However, spontaneous speaking, reading, and writing are preserved. The maintenance of the ability to process non-speech auditory information, including music, also remains relatively more intact than spoken language comprehension. Individuals who exhibit pure word deafness are also still able to recognize non-verbal sounds. The ability to interpret language via lip reading, hand gestures, and context clues is preserved as well. Sometimes, this agnosia is preceded by cortical deafness; however, this is not always the case. Researchers have documented that in most patients exhibiting auditory verbal agnosia, the discrimination of consonants is more difficult than that of vowels, but as with most neurological disorders, there is variation among patients.

Auditory verbal agnosia (AVA) is not the same as auditory agnosia; patients with (nonverbal) auditory agnosia have a relatively more intact speech comprehension system despite their impaired recognition of nonspeech sounds.

== Presentation ==
Auditory verbal agnosia can be referred to as a pure aphasia because it has a high degree of specificity. Despite an inability to comprehend speech, patients with auditory verbal agnosia typically retain the ability to hear and process non-speech auditory information, speak, read and write. This specificity suggests that there is a separation between speech perception, non-speech auditory processing, and central language processing. In support of this theory, there are cases in which speech and non-speech processing impairments have responded differentially to treatment. For example, some therapies have improved writing comprehension in patients over time, while speech remained critically impaired in those same patients.

The term "pure word deafness" is something of a misnomer. By definition, individuals with pure word deafness are not deaf – in the absence of other impairments, these individuals have normal hearing for all sounds, including speech. The term "deafness" originates from the fact that individuals with AVA are unable to comprehend speech that they hear. The term "pure word" refers to the fact that comprehension of verbal information is selectively impaired in AVA. For this reason, AVA is distinct from other auditory agnosias in which the recognition of nonspeech sounds is impaired. Classical (or pure) auditory agnosia is an inability to process environmental sounds. Interpretive or receptive agnosia (amusia) is an inability to understand music.

Patients with pure word deafness complain that speech sounds simply do not register, or that they tend not to come up. Other claims include speech sounding as if it were in a foreign language, the words having a tendency to run together, or the feeling that speech was simply not connected to the patient's voice.

== Causes ==
Auditory verbal agnosia has been shown to form as a result of tumor formation, especially in the posterior third ventricle, trauma, lesions, cerebral infarction, encephalitis as a result of herpes simplex, and Landau-Kleffner syndrome. The exact location of damage which results in pure word deafness is still under debate, but the planum temporale, posterior STG, and white matter damage to the acoustic radiations (AR) have all been implicated.

Auditory verbal agnosia is rarely diagnosed in its pure form. Auditory verbal agnosia can both present as the result of acute damage or as chronic, progressive degeneration over time. Cases have been documented that result from severe acute head trauma resulting in bilateral temporal lobe damage. Auditory information enters both hemispheres, so auditory agnosia usually develops from bitemporal damage or lesions. In contrast, auditory verbal agnosia has also been documented to present progressively over several years. In one such case, the patient exhibited progressive word deafness over a 9-year period but did not exhibit any other cognitive of mental deterioration. MRIs showed cortical atrophy in the left superior temporal lobe region.

Auditory verbal agnosia can also occur as a result of traumatic brain injury. In one case, a man fell and developed auditory verbal agnosia. This can be challenging to diagnose because he had fluent speech and could understand written language. However, he was unable to follow oral commands or repeat words. This marks a difference from other aphasias, including Wernike aphasia, because he had fluent speech and was able to understand written language. He explained that verbal language sounded like a buzzing and he could not understand it, but he could differentiate language from environmental sounds. The man underwent speech therapy and his condition improved over time.

In childhood, auditory verbal agnosia can also be caused by Landau-Kleffner syndrome, also called acquired epileptic aphasia. It is often the first symptom of this disease. A review of 45 cases suggested a relationship between prognosis and age of onset with poorer prognosis for those with earlier onset. In extremely rare cases, auditory verbal agnosia has been known to present as a symptom of neurodegenerative disease, such as Alzheimer's disease. In such cases auditory verbal agnosia is a symptom that is typically followed by more severe neurological symptoms typical of Alzheimer's disease.

== Diagnosis ==
There is no uniform performance among patients with auditory verbal agnosia; therefore it is not possible to attribute specific phonetic or phonological deficits to the syndrome. In order to diagnose AVA, two intact abilities need to be established:

- Words that are heard must have undergone adequate acoustic analysis as evidenced by correct repetition;
- The semantic representation of the word must be intact as evidenced by immediate comprehension of the word when presented in written form.

If both of these criteria are met and lack of auditory verbal comprehension is apparent, a diagnosis of AVA may follow.

In at least one instance, the Boston Diagnostic Aphasia Examination has been used to profile AVA. This method was able to show that the patient experienced marked difficulty in speech perception with minor to no minor deficits in production, reading, and writing, fitting the profile of AVA. While this provides a well-known example, other verbal-audio test batteries can and have also been used to diagnose pure speech deafness.

=== Cognitive deficits ===
Auditory verbal agnosia is the inability to distinguish phonemes. In some patients with unilateral auditory verbal agnosia, there is evidence that the ability to acoustically process speech signals is affected at the prephonemic level, preventing the conversion of these signals into phonemes. There are two predominate hypotheses that address what happens within the language center of the brain in people that have AVA. One of the hypotheses is that an early stage of auditory analysis is impaired. The fact that AVA patients have the ability to read shows that both the semantic system and the speech output lexicon are intact. The second hypotheses suggests that there is either a complete or partial disconnection of the auditory input lexicon from the semantic system. This would suggest that entries in the lexicon can still be activated but they cannot go on to cause subsequent semantic activation. In relation to these two different hypotheses, researchers in one study differentiated between two different types of AVA. According to this study, one form of AVA is a deficit at the prephonemic level and is related to the inability to comprehend rapid changes in sound. This form of AVA is associated with bilateral temporal lobe lesions. Speech perception in patients with this form of AVA has been shown to improve significantly in understanding when the pace of speech is drastically slowed. The second type of AVA that the study discusses is a deficit in linguistic discrimination that does not adhere to a prephonemic pattern. This form is associated with left unilateral temporal lobe lesions and may even be considered a form of Wernicke's aphasia. It is important in clinical settings to distinguish between AVA and Wernicke's aphasia. In auditory agnosia, patients can communicate through written language, but not in Wernike's aphasia. Often individuals diagnosed with auditory verbal agnosia are also incapable of discriminating between non-verbal sounds as well as speech. The underlying problem seems to be temporal in that understanding speech requires the discrimination between specific sounds which are closely spaced in time. Note that this is not unique to speech; studies using non-speech sounds closely spaced in time (dog bark, phone ring, lightning, etc.) have shown that those with auditory verbal agnosia are unable to discriminate between those sounds in the majority of cases, though a few putative examples of speech-specific impairment have been documented in the literature.

=== Neurological deficits ===
Auditory verbal agnosia is caused by bilateral damage, often in the form of cerebrovascular accidents which form as a result of an embolism, to the posterior superior temporal lobes or disruption of connections between these areas. A unilateral lesion in the left or right superior temporal lobe can also result in pure word deafness, this being much more common in the left hemisphere than the right. It is often associated with lesions to the left posterior superior temporal lobe, but no such unilateral case has yet been documented without damage to the white matter tract connecting superior temporal lobes bilaterally or bilateral damage to the superior temporal lobe. In cases where unilateral damage to the left superior temporal lobe has been documented, patients exhibited problems processing both speech and non-speech sounds (in other words, not typical of auditory verbal agnosia). These facts, in combination with the existence of cases of damage to these white matter tracts without detectable cortical damage, in combination with cases of pure word deafness resulting enlargement of the third ventricle alone suggest that the disorder results from damage to the left-right superior temporal circuit rather than the superior temporal area on one hemisphere or the other.

Many of the bilateral cases share one essential feature: after the first (unilateral) lesion, speech perception was typically intact after an initial period of disturbance. Only after the second lesion (in the other hemisphere) were permanent speech perception problems the consistent outcome. The fact that most of these patients only manifested auditory verbal agnosia subsequent to the second lesion supports the hypothesis that both sides of the superior temporal gyrus are necessary.

Auditory verbal agnosia is rarely diagnosed in its pure form. Auditory verbal agnosia can present as the result of acute damage or chronic, progressive degeneration over time. Cases have been documented that result from severe acute head trauma resulting in bilateral temporal lobe damage. In contrast, auditory verbal agnosia has also been documented to present progressively over several years. In one such case, the patient exhibited progressive word deafness over a 9-year period but did not exhibit any other cognitive of mental deterioration. This patient was found, using MRIs, to have cortical atrophy in the left superior temporal lobe region.

== Treatments ==
=== Sign language therapy ===
Sign language therapy has been identified as one of the top five most common treatments for auditory verbal agnosia. This type of therapy is most useful because, unlike other treatment methods, it does not rely on fixing the damaged areas of the brain. This is particularly important with AVA cases because it has been so hard to identify the causes of the agnosia in the first place, much less treat those areas directly. Sign language therapy, then, allows the person to cope and work around the disability, much in the same way it helps deaf people. In the beginning of therapy, most will work on identifying key objects and establishing an initial core vocabulary of signs. After this, the patient graduates to expand the vocabulary to intangible items or items that are not in view or present. Later, the patient learns single signs and then sentences consisting of two or more signs. In different cases, the sentences are first written down and then the patient is asked to sign them and speak them simultaneously. Because different AVA patients vary in the level of speech or comprehension they have, sign language therapy learning order and techniques are very specific to the individual's needs.

=== Tumor removal ===
In incidents where tumors and their pressure effects are the cause of pure word deafness, removal of the tumor has been shown to allow for the return of most auditory verbal comprehension.

=== Treatments used for Landau-Kleffner syndrome ===
==== Intravenous immunoglobulin therapy ====
Treating auditory verbal agnosia with intravenous immunoglobulin (IVIG) is controversial because of its inconsistency as a treatment method. Although IVIG is normally used to treat immune diseases, some individuals with auditory verbal agnosia have responded positively to the use of IVIG. Additionally, patients are more likely to relapse when treated with IVIG than other pharmacological treatments. IVIG is, thus, a controversial treatment as its efficacy in treating auditory verbal agnosia is dependent upon each individual and varies from case to case.

==== Diazepam therapy ====
In a study conducted by Masaaki Nagafuchi et al. (1993), a 7-year-old girl began taking a dose of 2 mg diazepam orally every day. She demonstrated major improvements in behavior and comprehension of speech while under diazepam therapy. Within a month, conversation problems were eliminated. After a year of therapy, her repetition ability was almost normal. After two years, her ability to discriminate monosyllabic words was within the normal range. Her audiological recognition had remained normal from the time of onset (i.e., she could recognize familiar noises such as a baby crying or a telephone ringing).

== See also ==
- Auditory agnosia
- Auditory processing disorder
- Deafness
