= Acoustic radiation =

Structures in the brain

Auditory radiations
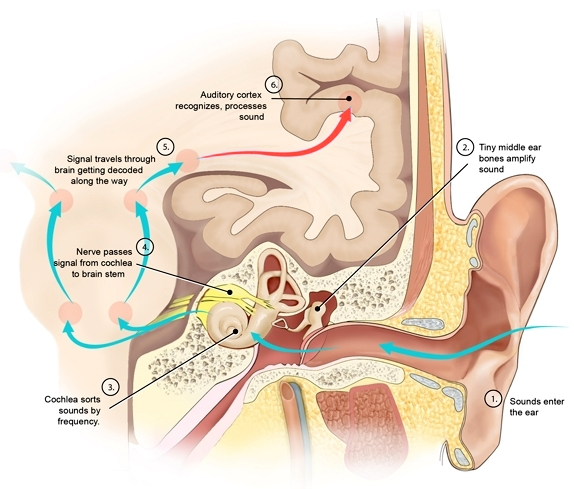
- Human auditory pathway. Acoustic radiation is shown as red arrow at center-top.

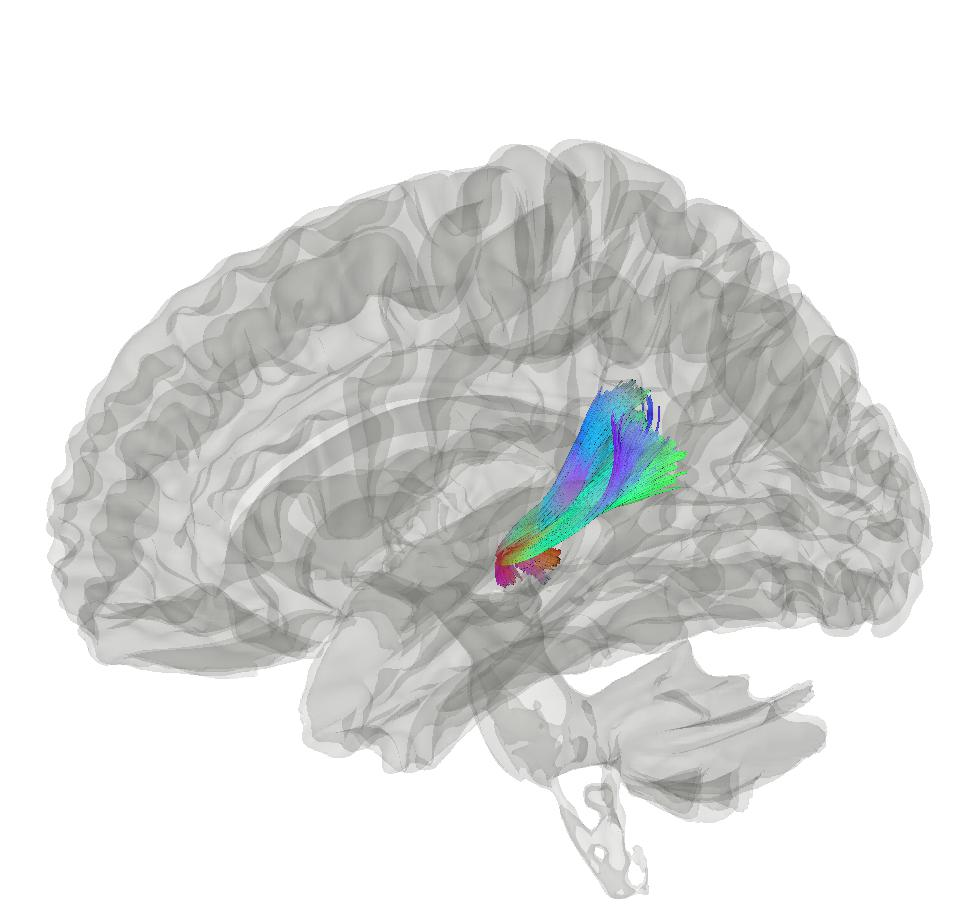

Details

Identifiers
- Latin: radiatio acustica
- NeuroNames: 2084
- TA98: A14.1.08.662; A14.1.09.545
- TA2: 5587
- FMA: 62413

Acoustic radiations (also called auditory radiations) are thalamocortical white-matter fiber bundles that convey auditory information from the medial geniculate nucleus of the thalamus to the primary auditory cortex in the temporal lobe of the brain.

== Anatomy ==
The auditory radiations originate predominantly from relay neurons in the medial geniculate nucleus and terminate mainly in Heschl’s (transverse temporal) gyri (Brodmann areas 41 and 42), which contain the primary auditory cortex. Along their course, the fibers travel through the deep subcortical white matter, within the internal capsule (especially the sublenticular segment) on their way to the cerebrum.

== Function ==
The auditory radiations provide the principal thalamocortical input to primary auditory cortex, supporting conscious perception of sound and forming part of the ascending central auditory pathway from brainstem nuclei through the midbrain and thalamus to cortex.

== Clinical significance ==
Because auditory information from each ear is represented bilaterally at higher levels of the auditory pathway, unilateral injury to the auditory radiations typically does not cause complete deafness, whereas bilateral interruption of the auditory radiations and/or bilateral cortical injury can produce cortical deafness. Case reports and series describe cortical hearing loss after sequential or bilateral lesions involving the auditory radiations and primary auditory cortices.
