= Sylvian point =

The Sylvian point is the point on the human skull nearest the Sylvian fissure and is located about 30 millimeters behind the zygomatic process of frontal bone. It is the name given to the stem of the lateral sulcus of the brain. It is named after the physician Franciscus Sylvius.
