= Brodmann area 52 =

Brain region

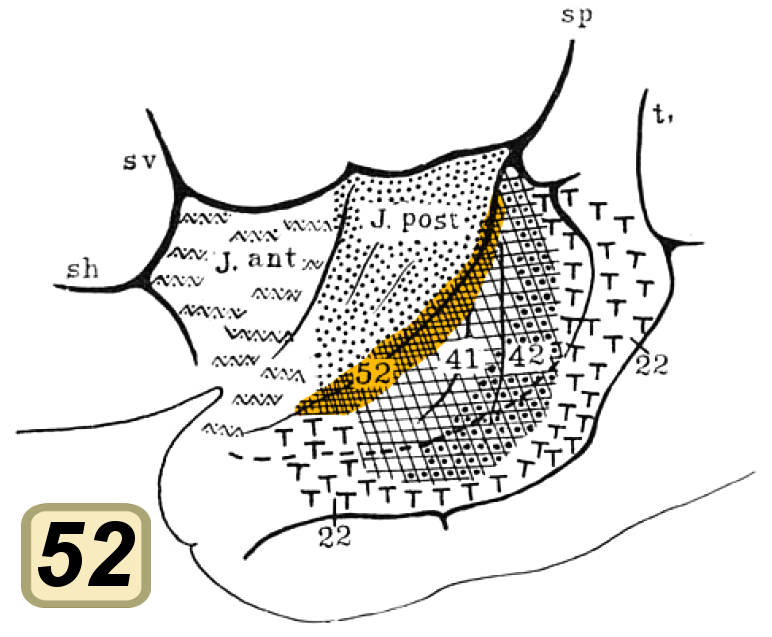
- Inside of the lateral sulcus. BA52 is shown in orange.

Identifiers
- NeuroNames: 2414
- NeuroLex ID: birnlex_1792
- FMA: 81153

Brodmann area 52 (BA52), also known as the parainsular area, is a part of the brain located in the temporal lobe, one of the major regions of the brain responsible for processing sensory information and memory. This area is named after the German neuroscientist Korbinian Brodmann, who mapped different regions as Brodmann areas of the brain based on their structure.

Brodmann area 52 is found along the lateral sulcus, which is a groove on the side of the brain, on the upper part of the temporal lobe. The area is located near the boundary between the temporal lobe and the insula, another important brain region involved in sensory processing and emotional responses. In terms of brain structure, BA52 is bordered on the outside by another area called the anterior transverse temporal area 42, which is involved in hearing.

Research has highlighted the role of Brodmann area 52 in cognitive function, particularly after a thalamic stroke. Using advanced brain imaging (NODDI), scientists found changes in the brain's microstructure in this area and its connections to the thalamus. These changes, such as reduced nerve fiber density and connectivity, were linked to better recovery of memory and thinking skills. Specifically, reduced connectivity in BA52 was strongly tied to improvements in auditory memory.

== See also ==
- Neuroanatomy
