= Richard L. Heschl =

Austrian anatomist (1824–1881)

Richard Ladislaus Heschl
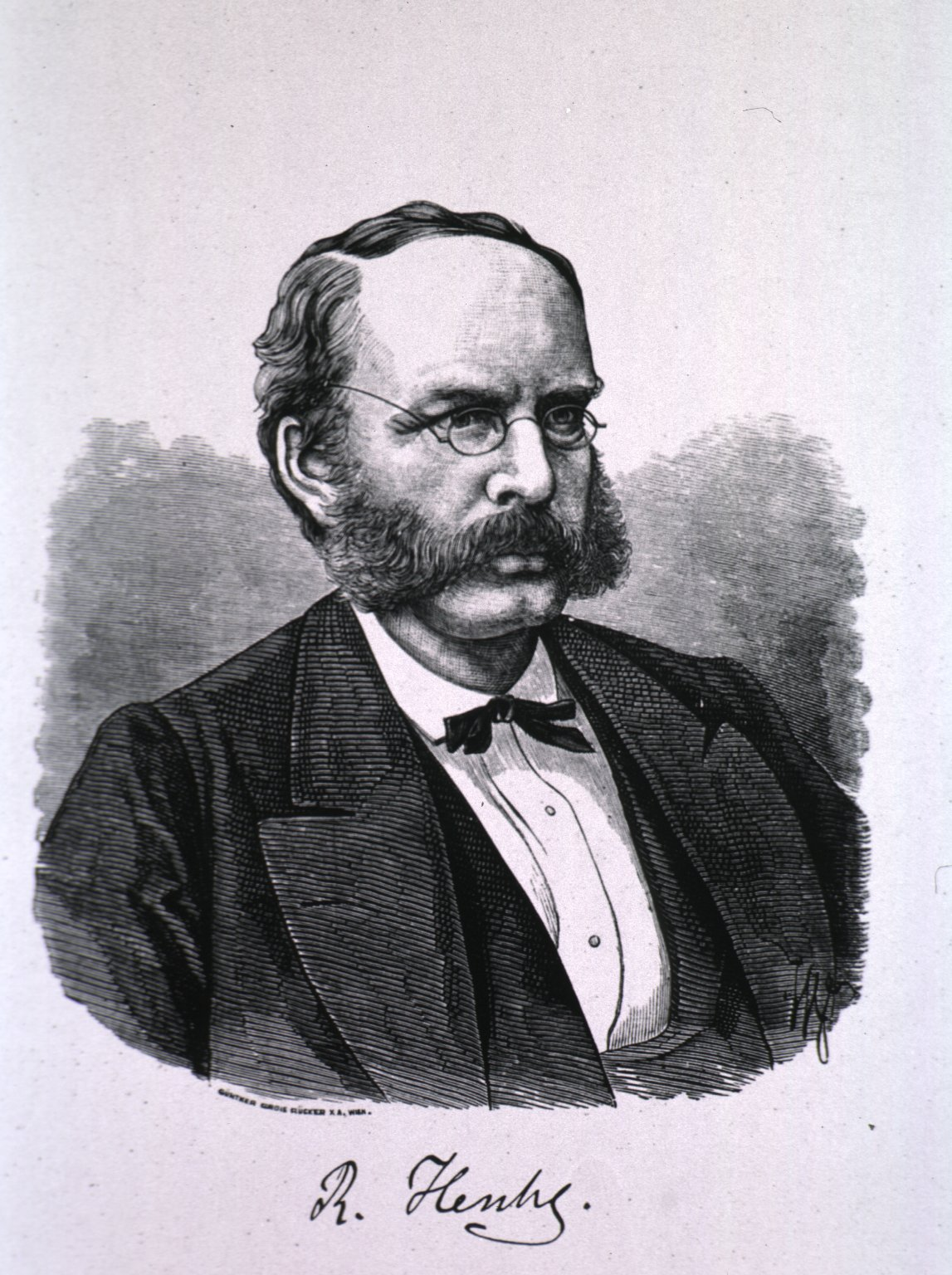
- Born: 5 July 1824; Welsdorf, Austrian Empire
- Died: 26 May 1881 (aged 56); Vienna
- Occupation: Anatomist

Richard Ladislaus Heschl (German: [ˈhɛʃl̩]; 5 July 1824 – 26 May 1881) was an Austrian anatomist, colleg professor, and academic administrator. He was the rector of the medical-surgical school at Graz.

== Biography ==
Heschl was born on 5 July 1824 in Welsdorf (today integral part of Fürstenfeld, Austria). In 1849 he received his medical doctorate from the University of Vienna, where in 1850 he became a "first assistant" to Carl von Rokitansky (1804-1878). In 1854 he was appointed professor of anatomy at the medical-surgical school in Olomouc, and during the following year became a professor of pathological anatomy in Kraków. In 1861 he became a professor at the medical-surgical school at Graz (from 1863 a full professor), serving as university rector in 1864–65. In 1875, he returned to the University of Vienna. After his death, his position at Vienna was filled by Hans Kundrat (1845-1893).

Heschl is credited as the first physician to describe the transverse temporal gyrus or "Heschl's gyrus", located in the primary auditory cortex. This anatomical structure processes incoming auditory information.

Heschl died on 26 May 1881 in Vienna, at the age of 56.

== Literary works ==
- Compendium der allgemeinen und speziellen pathologischen Anatomie, (1855) - Compendium of general and special pathological anatomy.
- Sectionstechnik, (1859)
- Über die vordere quere Schläfenwindung, (1878) - On the front transverse temporal gyrus.

== See also ==
- "Friedrich Albert von Zenker". Who Named It. Archived from the original on March 22, 2002.
- "Baronet Sir William Osler". Who Named It. Archived from the original on November 10, 2005., Osler's triad
