= Planum temporale =

Area of the human brain

- Approximate location of Wernicke's area highlighted in white

Identifiers
- NeuroNames: 2333
- TA98: A14.1.09.143
- TA2: 5493
- FMA: 74564

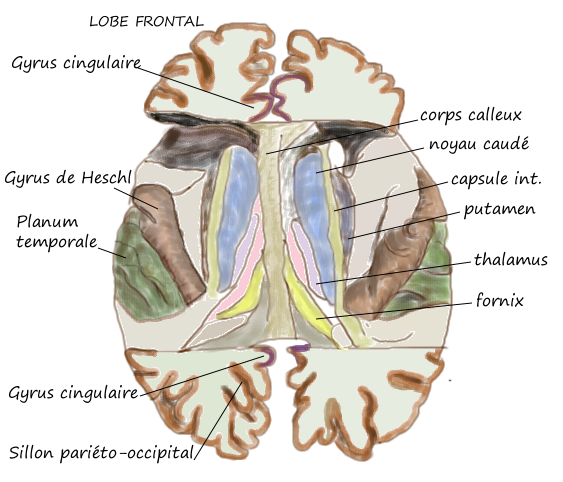
Diagram labeling planum temporale in green

The planum temporale is the cortical area just posterior to the auditory cortex (Heschl's gyrus) within the Sylvian fissure. It is a triangular region which forms the heart of Wernicke's area, one of the most important functional areas for language. Original studies on this area found that the planum temporale was one of the most asymmetric regions in the brain, larger in the left cerebral hemisphere than the right.

== Location ==
The planum temporale makes up the superior surface of the superior temporal gyrus to the parietal lobe. The posterior extent of the planum temporale has been variably defined, which has led to disputes to estimates of size and degree of asymmetry.

== Asymmetry ==
The planum temporale shows a significant asymmetry. In 65% of all individuals the left planum temporale appears to be more developed, while the right planum temporale is more developed in only 11%. In some people’s brains, the planum temporale is more than five times larger on the left than on the right, making it the most asymmetrical structure in the brain. Evidence for this asymmetry has also been seen in great apes.

This greater size of the left planum temporale compared with the right is already present in the fetus, where it can be observed starting from the 31st week of gestation. This observation strengthens the hypothesis of a genetic predisposition for brain asymmetry, however the effect of fetal experience has not been ruled out. Leftward asymmetry, however, does not directly relate to asymmetry of language processing in all individuals.

=== Gender based asymmetry ===
Imaging has repeatedly suggested gender marked differences in planum temporale surface area asymmetry. There have been multiple findings suggesting a greater leftward surface area asymmetry in male subjects, with no significant difference as mediated by gender of the right part of the planum temporale.

Recent evidence can be used to support the idea that differences between males and females in planum temporale asymmetry begin to develop and show early in development, potentially during prenatal stages. Gender based asymmetry may be the result of environmental factors occurring in-utero, such as levels of testosterone.

Certain studies have found differences within the planum temporale on a microscopic level, finding greater cell packing density in females, as well as a reduction of micro-structural asymmetry. Females have also been found to display asymmetry in grey matter volume.

Due to the novel nature of these findings, researchers have yet to discern how to interpret these sex-based differences on brain function.

== Functions ==
The planum temporale is a highly lateralized brain structure involved with language and with music. Although the planum temporale is found to have an asymmetry in the normal population, having a leftward bias in right-handed individuals, people who possess absolute pitch have an increased leftward asymmetry of the planum temporale. This is due to a smaller than average volume of the right planum temporale and not a larger than average volume of the left. The planum temporale may also play an important role in auditory processing with recent research suggesting that the region is responsible for representing the location of sounds in space.

There have also been many studies that show the asymmetry of the planum temporale to be related to handedness of subjects. There have been reports of decreased asymmetry displayed on the left side of the planum temporale in those that are dominantly left handed.

== Atypical development ==
The planum temporale seems to be symmetrical in individuals with dyslexia, which may indicate that their low specialization in the left hemisphere is a cause of their disability. This symmetry also holds for people who stutter, although it is also possible to see a larger right planum temporale in stutters. It is thought that this bias for right hemisphere could be interrupting or impeding information flow between Wernickes and Broca's, which are on the left hemisphere.

MRI studies have shown that the planum temporale in schizophrenics is more symmetrical. This reduced lateralization correlates with more severe positive symptoms, such as hallucinations, as measured by the PANSS.

Sexual dimorphism has shown to play an important role on planum temporale studies within schizophrenia. These findings have highlighted the relevance and importance of sex/gender as a plays a key role on PT in schizophrenia, underlying the importance of gender as a key component of brain morphology and the specialized brain structure and function for schizophrenia.

== Non-human brains ==
Although the brain area was thought to be unique to humans, almost like the anatomic version of the linguistic "language organ" of Noam Chomsky, it was shown to be similarly leftward asymmetric in chimpanzees and other great apes but not other primates, as was a related, rightward asymmetric, brain region the planum parietale that is implicated with dyslexia in humans. Monkeys show cellular asymmetry but not gross anatomic asymmetry of the planum temporale. (Brain Research, 2008). The question still remains open; what are great apes or monkeys using this "non-human primate language area" for?

== Hemispheric differences ==
Summary Table
Left Hemisphere	Right Hemisphere
Normal development- larger in size and surface area	Normal development- smaller in size and surface area
Decrease in size leads to difficulty with word recognition	-------
Damage can lead to impaired ability to decode phonemes	Damage can lead to impaired ability to decode phonemes
Decrease in size can lead to dyslexia	Increase in size can lead to dyslexia
Lesions result in difficulty of speech recognition	-------
-------	Increased cortical thickness related to enhanced detection of visual motion in early deaf subjects

== Additional images ==
3D visualization of the planum temporale in an average human brain

Planum temporale highlighted in green on coronal T1 MRI images

Planum temporale highlighted in green on sagittal T1 MRI images

Planum temporale highlighted in green on transversal T1 MRI images
