= Brodmann areas 41 and 42 =

Parts of the primary auditory cortex

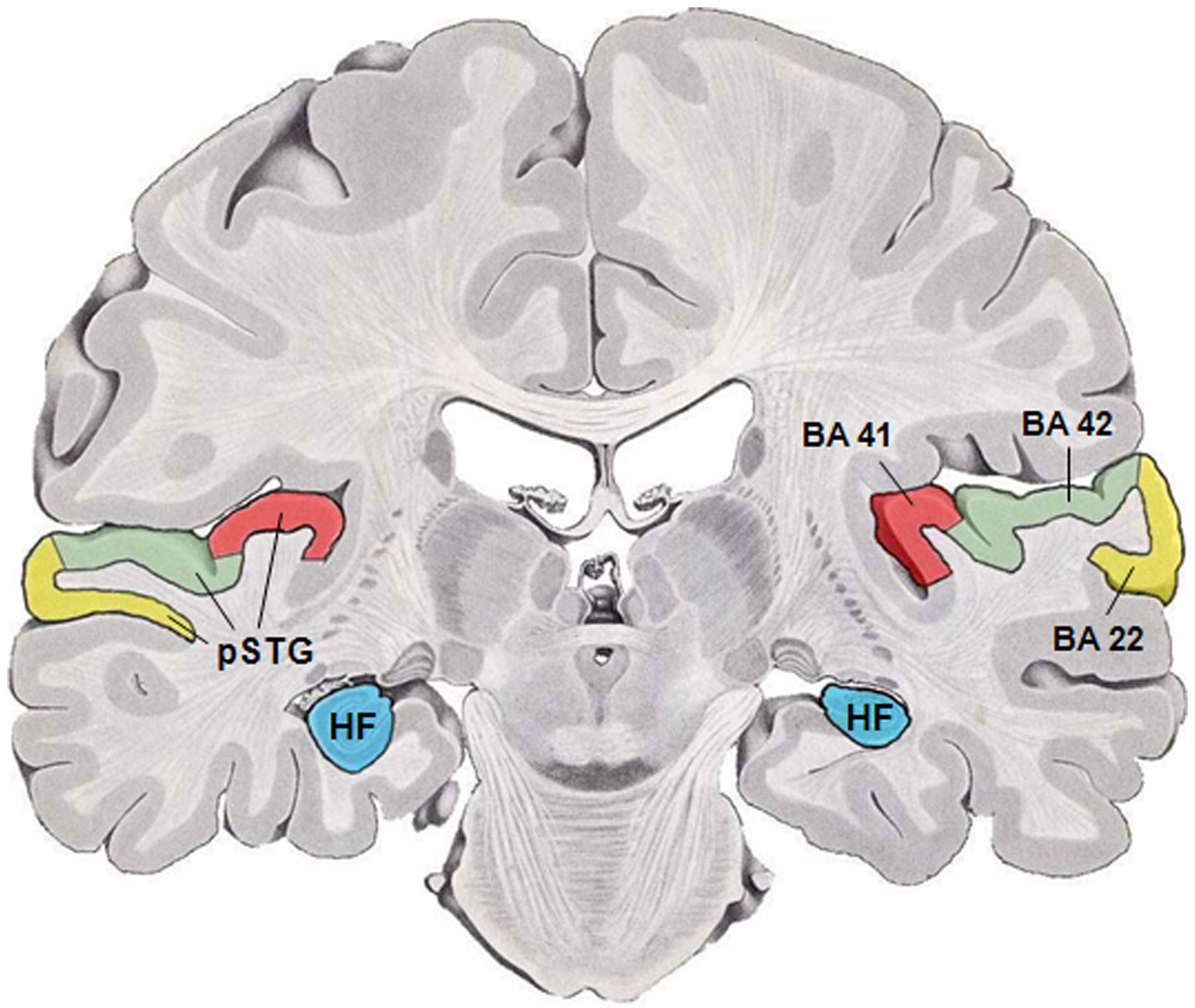
- Coronal section of human brain. Brodmann area 41 Brodmann area 42

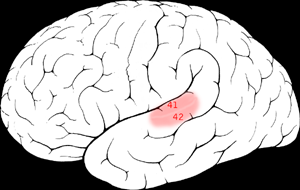
- Lateral view of human cerebrum. BA41 and 42 shown in red.

Identifiers
- Acronym: BA41, BA42
- NeuroLex ID: birnlex_1774

Brodmann areas 41 and 42 are parts of the primary auditory cortex.

Brodmann area 41 is also known as the anterior transverse temporal area 41 (H). It is a cytoarchitectonic division of the cerebral cortex occupying the anterior transverse temporal gyrus (H) in the bank of the lateral sulcus on the dorsal surface of the temporal lobe. Brodmann area 41 is bounded medially by the parainsular area 52 (H) and laterally by the posterior transverse temporal area 42 (H) (Brodmann-1909).

Brodmann area 42 is also known as the posterior transverse temporal area 42 (H), and is also a subdivision of the temporal lobe. Brodmann area 42 is bounded medially by the anterior transverse temporal area 41 (H) and laterally by the superior temporal area 22 (Brodmann-1909).

== Function ==
Brodmann areas 41 and 42 are parts of the primary auditory cortex. This is the first cortical destination of auditory information stemming from the thalamus. Neural activity in this brain part corresponds most strongly with the objective physical properties of a sound.

== Additional images ==
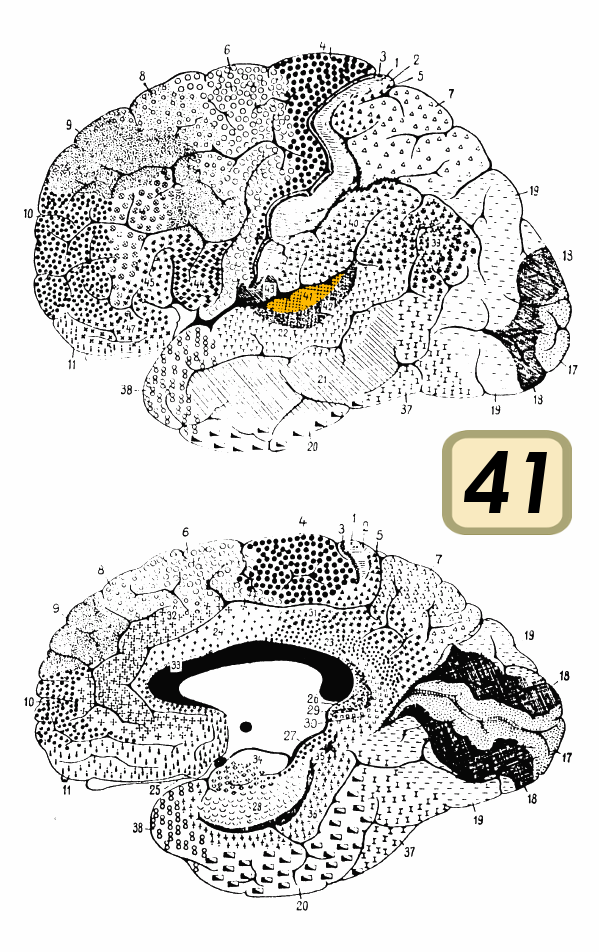
BA41.

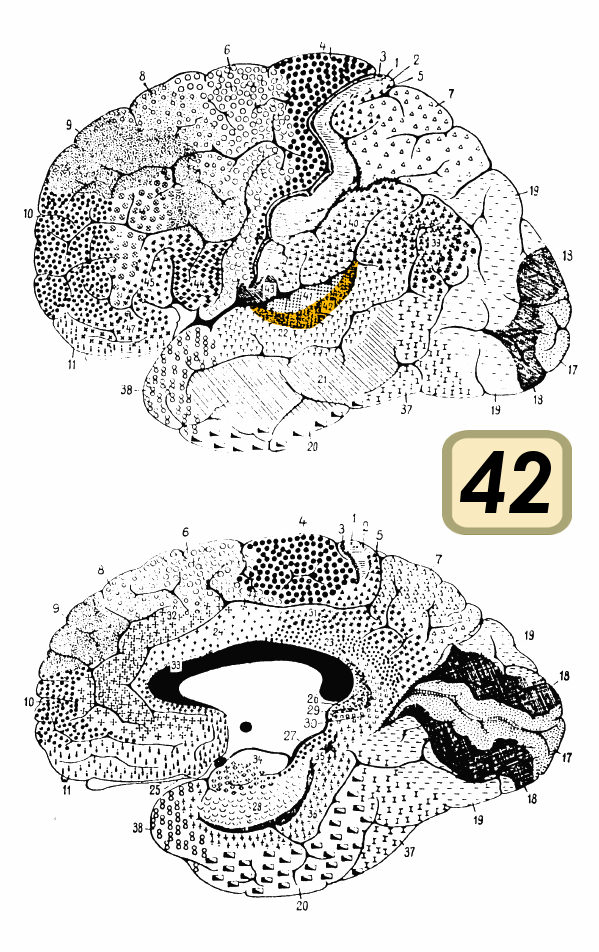
BA42

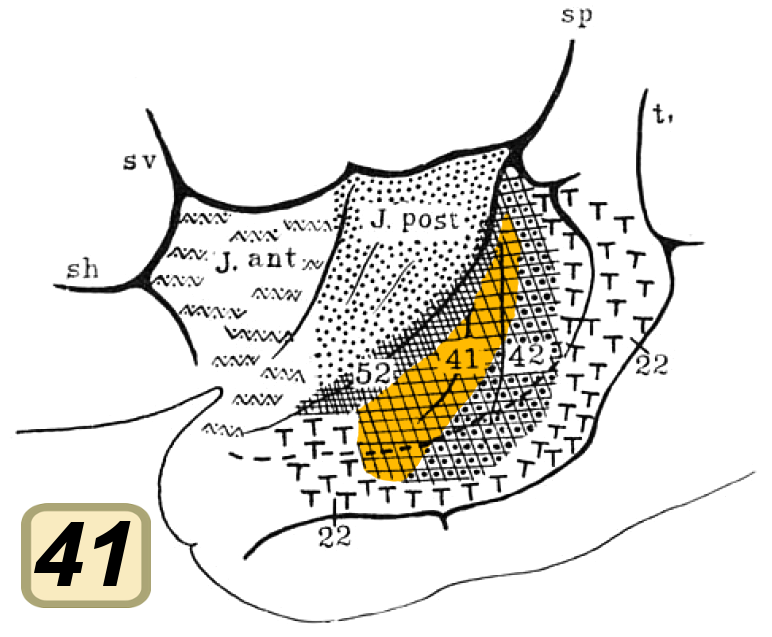
BA41. Inside lateral sulcus.

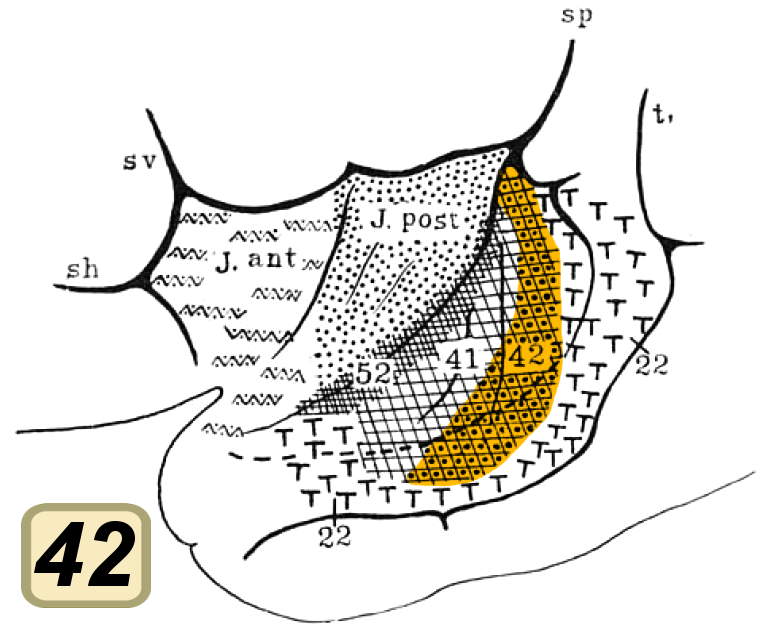
BA42. Inside lateral sulcus.

== See also ==
- Auditory cortex
- Brodmann area 22
- Auditosensory cortex
