= Transverse temporal gyrus =

Gyrus of the primary auditory cortex of the brain

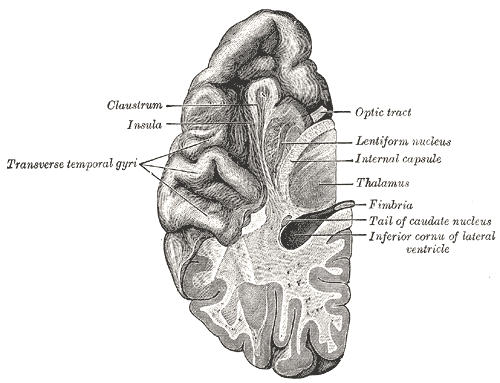
- Section of brain showing upper surface of temporal lobe ("transverse temporal gyri" visible at center left)

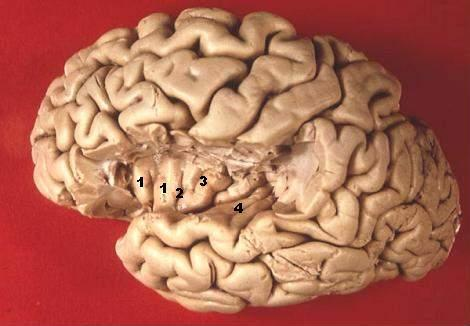
- Human brain view on transverse temporal and insular gyri (gyri temporales transversi are #4)

Details
- Part of: Temporal lobe
- Parts: Primary auditory cortex
- Artery: Middle cerebral

Identifiers
- Latin: gyri temporales transversi
- NeuroNames: 1520
- TA98: A14.1.09.140
- TA2: 5491
- FMA: 72016

The transverse temporal gyrus, also called Heschl's gyrus (/ˈhɛʃəlz ˈdʒaɪrəs/) or Heschl's convolutions, is a gyrus found in the area of each primary auditory cortex buried within the lateral sulcus of the human brain, occupying Brodmann areas 41 and 42. Transverse temporal gyri are superior to and separated from the planum temporale (cortex involved in language production) by Heschl's sulcus. Transverse temporal gyri are found in varying numbers in both the right and left hemispheres of the brain and one study found that this number is not related to the hemisphere or dominance of hemisphere studied in subjects. Transverse temporal gyri can be viewed in the sagittal plane as either an omega shape (if one gyrus is present) or a heart shape (if two gyri and a sulcus are present).

Transverse temporal gyri are the first cortical structures to process incoming auditory information. Anatomically, the transverse temporal gyri are distinct in that they run mediolaterally (toward the center of the brain), rather than front to back as all other temporal lobe gyri run.

The Heschl's gyri are named after Richard L. Heschl.

== Processing tone ==
The transverse temporal gyri are active during auditory processing under fMRI for tone and semantic tasks. Transverse temporal gyri were found in one study to have significantly faster processing rates (33 Hz) in the left hemisphere compared to those in the right hemisphere (3 Hz). Additionally this difference in processing rate was found to be related to the volume of rate-related cortex in the gyri; right transverse temporal gyri were found to be more active during temporal processing, and these gyri were found to have more "rate-related cortex". White and grey matter volumes of transverse temporal gyri were not found to relate to this processing speed, although larger white matter volumes in subjects are associated with increased sensitivity to "rapid auditory input".

The role of transverse temporal gyri in auditory processing of tone is demonstrated by a study by Wong, Warrier et al. (2008). This study revealed the following: subjects who could successfully form an association between Mandarin Chinese "pitch patterns" and word meaning were found to have transverse temporal gyri with larger volume than subjects who had "difficulty learning these associations." Successful completion of the previous task also was found to be associated with a "greater concentration of white matter" in the left transverse temporal gyri of the subject. In general, larger transverse temporal gyri "could be associated with more efficient processing of speech-related cues which could facilitate learning and perceiving new speech sounds."

== Inner voice ==
Research on the inner voice perceived by humans led to the identification of these gyri as the area of the brain activated during such dialogue with oneself. Specifically, Heschl's gyrus responded to spontaneous inner speech, while it was hypoactive during task-elicited inner speech (repeating words prompted by an experimenter).

== Mismatch negativity ==
One of the famous event-related potential (ERP) components is mismatch negativity. This component is considered to represent a prediction error process in the brain. This ERP has probably two generators, one in the right prefrontal lobe, and the other in the primary auditory regions - the transverse temporal gyrus and the superior temporal gyrus.

== Additional images ==
3D view of the transverse temporal gyrus in an average human brain

Transverse temporal gyrus highlighted in green on coronal T1 MRI images

Transverse temporal gyrus highlighted in green on sagittal T1 MRI images

Transverse temporal gyrus highlighted in green on transversal T1 MRI images
