= Cortical deafness =

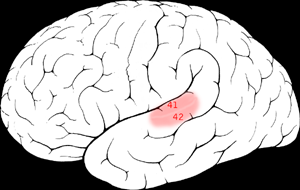
- Location of the primary auditory cortex in the brain
- Specialty: Neurology, otorhinolaryngology

Cortical deafness is a rare form of sensorineural hearing loss caused by damage to the primary auditory cortex. Cortical deafness is an auditory disorder where the patient is unable to hear sounds but has no apparent damage to the structures of the ear (see auditory system). It has been argued to be as the combination of auditory verbal agnosia and auditory agnosia. Patients with cortical deafness cannot hear any sounds, that is, they are not aware of sounds including non-speech, voices, and speech sounds. Although patients appear and feel completely deaf, they can still exhibit some reflex responses such as turning their head towards a loud sound.

== Cause ==
Cortical deafness is caused by bilateral cortical lesions in the primary auditory cortex located in the temporal lobes of the brain. The ascending auditory pathways are damaged, causing a loss of perception of sound. Inner ear functions, however, remains intact. Cortical deafness is most often caused by stroke, but can also result from brain injury or birth defects. More specifically, a common cause is bilateral embolic stroke to the area of Heschl's gyri.

It is thought that cortical deafness could be a part of a spectrum of an overall cortical hearing disorder. In some cases, patients with cortical deafness have had recovery of some hearing function, resulting in partial auditory deficits such as auditory verbal agnosia. This syndrome might be difficult to distinguish from a bilateral temporal lesion

== Diagnosis ==
Since cortical deafness and auditory agnosia have many similarities, diagnosing the disorder proves to be difficult. Bilateral lesions near the primary auditory cortex in the temporal lobe are important criteria. Cortical deafness requires demonstration that brainstem auditory responses are normal, but cortical evoked potentials are impaired. Brainstem auditory evoked potentials, also called brainstem auditory evoked responses, show the neuronal activity in the auditory nerve, cochlear nucleus, superior olive, and inferior colliculus of the brainstem. They typically have a response latency of no more than six milliseconds with an amplitude of approximately one microvolt. The latency of the responses gives critical information: if cortical deafness is applicable, long latency responses are completely abolished and middle latency responses are either abolished or significantly impaired. In auditory agnosia, long and middle latency responses are preserved.

Another important aspect of cortical deafness that is often overlooked is that patients feel deaf. They are aware of their inability to hear environmental sounds, non-speech and speech sounds. Patients with auditory agnosia can be unaware of their deficit, and insist that they are not deaf. Verbal deafness and auditory agnosia are disorders of a selective, perceptive and associative nature whereas cortical deafness relies on the anatomic and functional disconnection of the auditory cortex from acoustic impulses.

=== Case examples ===
Although cortical deafness has very specific parameters of diagnosis, its causes can vary tremendously. The following are three case studies with different reasons for cortical deafness.

1. A case published in 2001 describes the patient as 20-year-old man referred for cochlear implants because of bilateral deafness following a motorcycle accident two years earlier. His CT shows hemorrhagic lesions involving both internal capsules. He was comatose for several weeks and awoke quadriparetic, cognitively impaired and completely deaf. He exhibited a response towards the occasional sudden, loud sound, however, by turning his head. Reading and writing capabilities were maintained, and he was able to communicate by lip-reading. His own speech was dysarthric, but comprehensible. Normal tympanograms and stapedial reflexes imply that the middle and inner ear remained functioning and the auditory nerve was intact. His auditory nerve was tested by evoking responses with normal auditory nerve potentials at 10 dB bilaterally. The results of the brainstem auditory evoked responses waves were normal, but an abnormal complex IV-V suggested that the pathways were functioning through the brainstem, but there was a lesion present in the mid-brain. With these findings, it was determined the patient had cortical deafness due to bilateral interruption of the ascending auditory pathway associated with hemorrhagic lesions of both internal capsules. Therefore, cochlear implantation was not performed.
2. Published in 1994, this patient was monitored over the course of almost 20 years after exhibiting signs of hearing impairment as an infant. Audiologic and related test results in concurrence with MRI confirmed bilateral absence of considerable portions of her temporal lobes resulting in cortical deafness. Although physiologic measures demonstrate normal peripheral hearing sensitivity, this patient's speech has the inflection and prosodic characteristics associated with profound peripheral hearing loss, and she is unable to understand spoken communication. Behaviorally obtained pure-tone thresholds were variable, ranging from normal to moderate hearing loss with normal middle ear muscle reflexes and normal ABRs to high- and low-intensity stimuli. Auditory middle latency and cortical evoked potentials were grossly abnormal, consistent with the central nature of cortical deafness. Because of her inability to communicate auditorily, this patient was ultimately taught American Sign Language and educated at the Louisiana School for the Deaf. At the completion of the case study, the patient was married and expecting a child.
3. A study published in 2013 described a 56-year-old woman with history of hypertension, hypercholesterolemia, and multiple strokes. The patient was presented with a complaint of complete bilateral hearing loss. In March 2009, she experienced an acute right-sided insulotemporal intracerebral hemorrhage. Immediately after this event, the patient complained of hearing loss with the inability to hear all sounds except for severe bilateral tinnitus. Imaging revealed sequelae in the left cerebral cortex from her previous strokes. The new right-sided hemorrhage was centered on the posterior putamen with surrounding edema involving the posterior portion of the posterior limbs of the internal, external, and extreme capsules. Signal abnormalities extended into the right temporal lobe. The patient had no other neurologic deficits and spoke fluently, although with poor internal volume control of her voice. Otoscopic examination revealed normal-appearing external auditory canals, intact tympanic membranes bilaterally, and normal middle ear anatomy. Audiogram at that time showed bilateral profound hearing loss with no responses to pure-tone or speech testing.
4. In a case study by Sasidharan et al. (2020), a patient developed cortical deafness following bacterial meningitis at 5 months old. The case was evaluated when the patient was 7 years old. Objective tests showed normal peripheral hearing, but the patient did not respond to sounds during pure-tone audiometry. Late latency response tests showed absent bilateral responses, confirming cortical deafness. This case highlights that meningitis can lead to cortical deafness in addition to peripheral hearing loss.

== Treatment ==
Auditory perception can improve with time. There seems to be a level of neuroplasticity that allows patients to recover the ability to perceive environmental and certain musical sounds. Patients presenting with cortical hearing loss and no other associated symptoms recover to a variable degree, depending on the size and type of the cerebral lesion. Patients whose symptoms include both motor deficits and aphasias often have larger lesions with an associated poorer prognosis in regard to functional status and recovery.

Cochlear or auditory brainstem implantation could also be treatment options. Electrical stimulation of the peripheral auditory system may result in improved sound perception or cortical remapping in patients with cortical deafness. However, hearing aids are an inappropriate answer for cases like these. Any auditory signal, regardless if has been amplified to normal or high intensities, is useless to a system unable to complete its processing. Ideally, patients should be directed toward resources to aid them in lip-reading, learning American Sign Language, as well as speech and occupational therapy. Patients should follow-up regularly to evaluate for any long-term recovery.

== History ==
Early reports, published in the late 19th century, describe patients with acute onset of deafness after experiencing symptoms described as apoplexy. The only means of definitive diagnosis in these reports were postmortem dissections. Subsequent cases throughout the 20th century reflect advancements in diagnoses of both hearing loss and stroke. With the advent of audiometric and electrophysiologic studies, investigators could diagnose cortical deafness with increasing precision. Advances in imaging techniques, such as MRI, greatly improved the diagnosis and localization of cerebral infarcts that coincide with primary or secondary auditory centers. Neurological and cognitive testing help to distinguish between total cortical deafness and auditory agnosia, resulting in the inability to perceive words, music, or specific environmental sounds.
