= Superior temporal gyrus =

One of three gyri of the temporal lobe of the brain

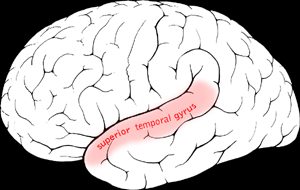
- Superior temporal gyrus of the human brain.

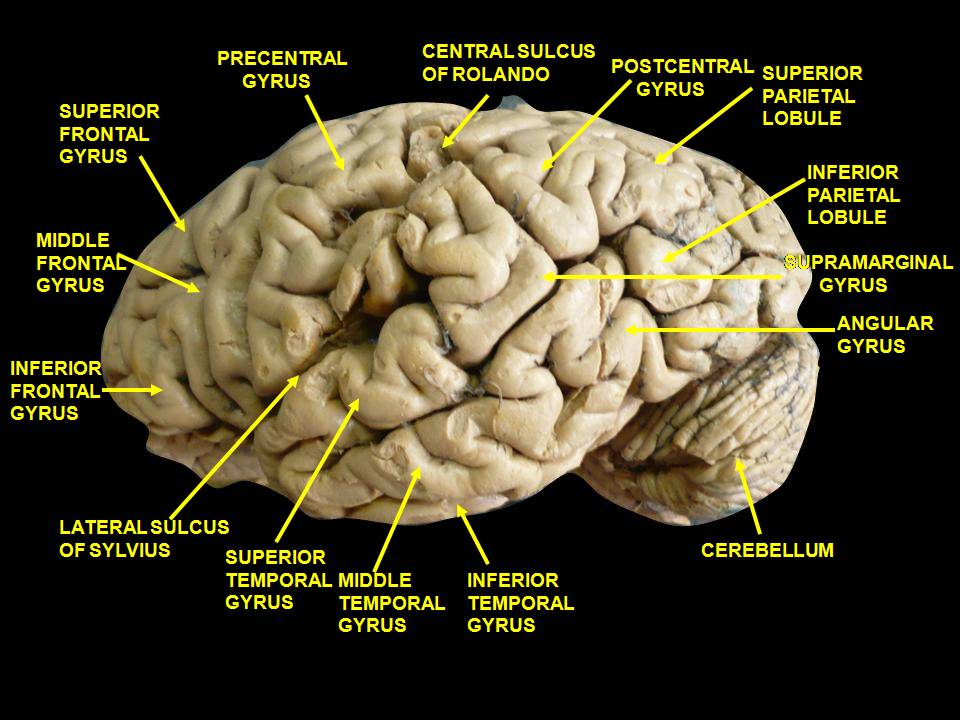
- Cerebrum. Lateral view. Deep dissection. Superior temporal gyrus is visible at the center.

Details
- Part of: Temporal lobe
- Location: Temporal lobe of the human brain
- Artery: Middle cerebral

Identifiers
- Latin: gyrus temporalis superior
- NeuroNames: 136
- NeuroLex ID: birnlex_1648
- TA98: A14.1.09.138
- TA2: 5489
- FMA: 61905

The superior temporal gyrus (STG) is one of three (sometimes two) gyri in the temporal lobe of the human brain, which is located laterally to the head, situated somewhat above the external ear.

The superior temporal gyrus is bounded by:

- the lateral sulcus above;
- the superior temporal sulcus (not always present or visible) below;
- an imaginary line drawn from the preoccipital notch to the lateral sulcus posteriorly.

The superior temporal gyrus contains several important structures of the brain, including:

- Brodmann areas 41 and 42, marking the location of the auditory cortex, the cortical region responsible for the sensation of sound;
- Wernicke's area, Brodmann area 22, an important region for the processing of speech so that it can be understood as language.

The superior temporal gyrus contains the auditory cortex, which is responsible for processing sounds. Specific sound frequencies map precisely onto the auditory cortex. This auditory (or tonotopic) map is similar to the homunculus map of the primary motor cortex. Some areas of the superior temporal gyrus are specialized for processing combinations of frequencies, and other areas are specialized for processing changes in amplitude or frequency. The superior temporal gyrus also includes Wernicke's area, which (in most people) is located in the left hemisphere. It is the major area involved in the comprehension of language. The superior temporal gyrus is involved in auditory processing, including language, but also has been implicated as a critical structure in social cognition.

Various parts of the STG might be referred to as anterior (aSTG), middle (mSTG), and posterior (pSTG).

== Function ==
The superior temporal gyrus has been involved in the perception of emotions in facial stimuli.) Furthermore, the superior temporal gyrus is an essential structure involved in auditory processing, as well as in the function of language in individuals who may have an impaired vocabulary, or are developing a sense of language. The superior temporal gyrus has been discovered to be an important structure in the pathway consisting of the amygdala and prefrontal cortex, which are all involved in social cognition processes. Including the superior temporal gyrus, areas more anterior and dorsal within the temporal lobe have been linked to the ability of processing information the many changeable characteristics of a face. Research conducted with the use of neuroimaging have found patients with schizophrenia have structural abnormalities in their superior temporal gyrus.

fMRI analysis has evidenced a link between insight based problem solving and activity in the right anterior superior-temporal gyrus, specifically in relation to the sudden flash of understanding commonly referred to as an 'Aha!' moment.

=== Social context ===
The superior temporal gyrus (STG) is important for language comprehension, but studies also suggest that it plays a functional role in the cocktail party effect. A magnetoencephalography study was conducted on participants that were exposed to five differing listening conditions each with a different level of background noise. It was discovered that the STG has a strong connection with the attended speech stream in a cocktail party setting. When the attended speech stream wasn’t disrupted by background noise a bilateral connection was displayed, but as more background noise was introduced the connection became left-hemisphere-dependent.

== Additional images ==
Position of superior temporal gyrus (shown in red).

Lateral view of a human brain, main gyri labeled.

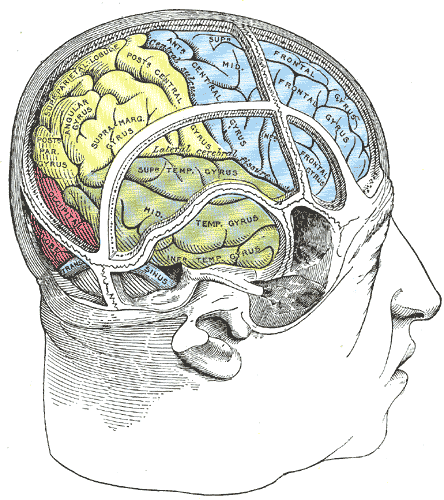
Drawing of a cast to illustrate the relations of the brain to the skull. (Superior temporal gyrus labeled at center, in green section.)

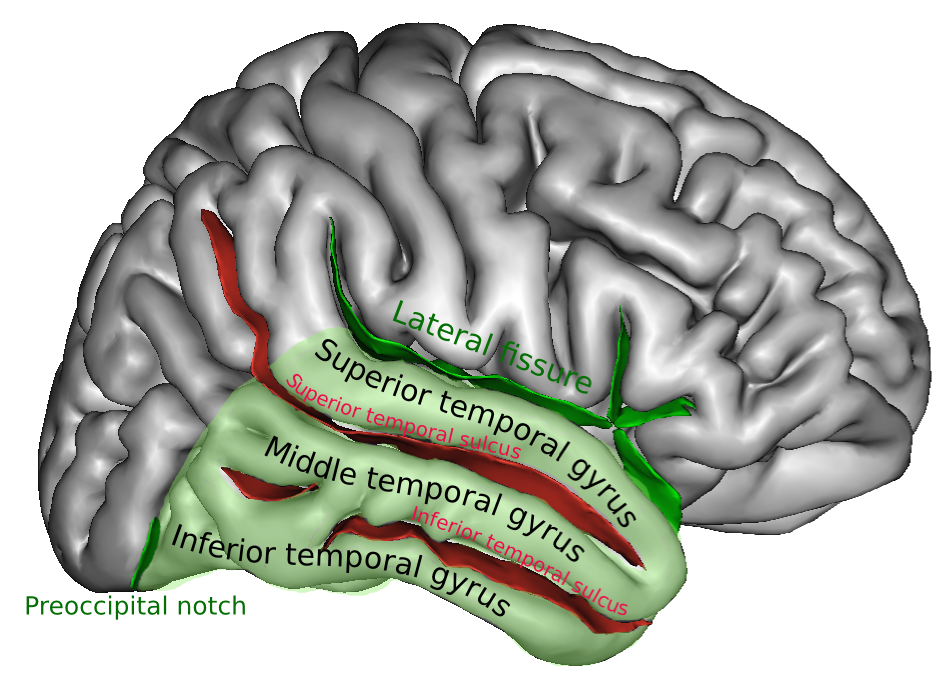
Right temporal lobe (shown in green). Superior temporal gyrus is visible at the top of the green area.

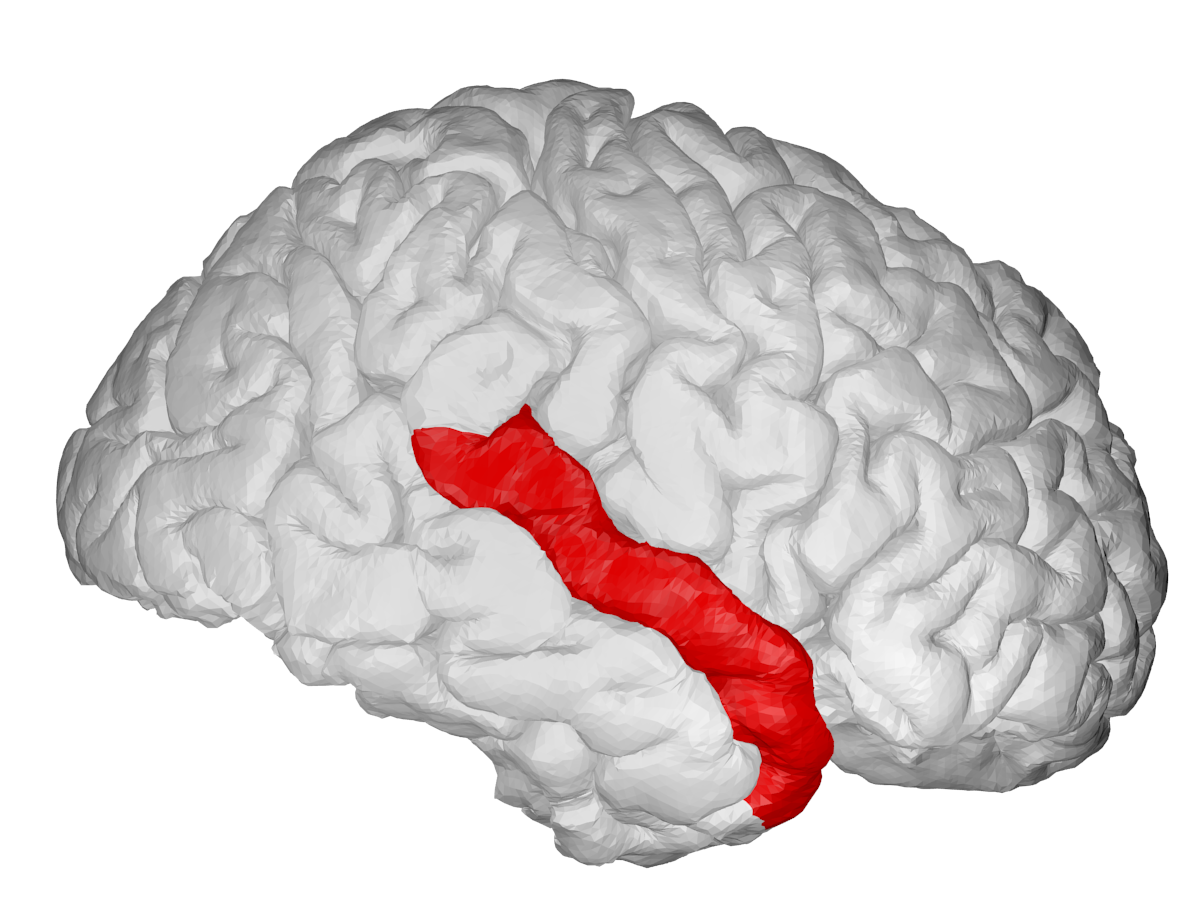
Superior temporal gyrus, right hemisphere.

Superior temporal gyrus highlighted in green on coronal T1 MRI images

Superior temporal gyrus highlighted in green on sagittal T1 MRI images

Superior temporal gyrus highlighted in green on transversal T1 MRI images
