= Lateral sulcus =

Crevice in the brain separating the frontal and parietal lobes from the temporal

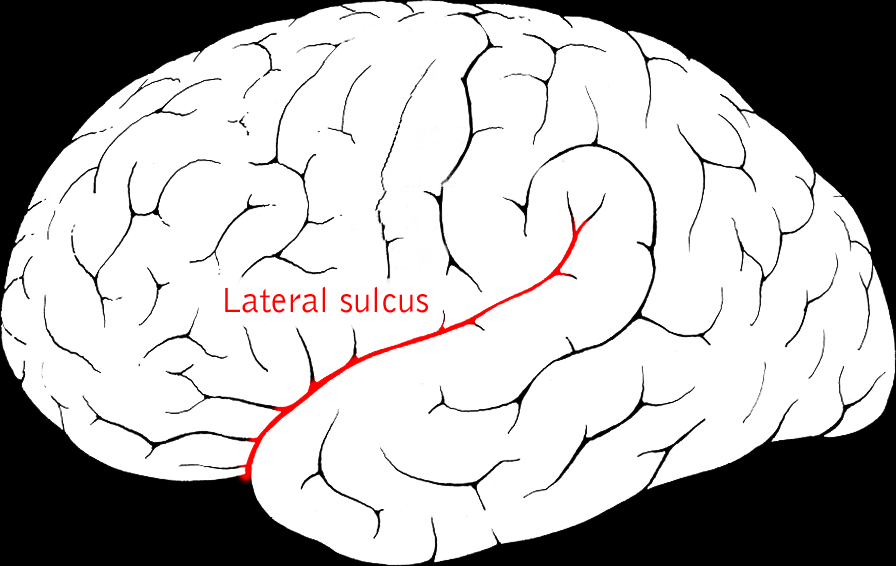
- Lateral sulcus

Details

Identifiers
- Latin: fissura lateralis cerebri sulcus lateralis cerebri fissura Sylvii
- NeuroNames: 49
- NeuroLex ID: birnlex_1487
- TA98: A14.1.06.006; A14.1.09.104
- TA2: 5436, 5877
- FMA: 77801

The lateral sulcus (or lateral fissure, also called Sylvian fissure, after Franciscus Sylvius) is the most prominent sulcus of each cerebral hemisphere in the human brain. The lateral sulcus is a deep fissure in each hemisphere that separates the frontal and parietal lobes from the temporal lobe. The insular cortex lies deep within the lateral sulcus.

== Anatomy ==
The lateral sulcus divides both the frontal lobe and parietal lobe above from the temporal lobe below. It is in both hemispheres of the brain. The lateral sulcus is one of the earliest-developing sulci of the human brain, appearing around the fourteenth week of gestational age.

The insular cortex lies deep within the lateral sulcus.

The lateral sulcus has a number of side branches. Two of the most prominent and most regularly found are the ascending (also called vertical) ramus and the horizontal ramus of the lateral fissure, which subdivide the inferior frontal gyrus. The lateral sulcus also contains the transverse temporal gyri, which are part of the primary and below the surface auditory cortex.

Due to a phenomenon called the Yakovlevian torque, the lateral sulcus is often longer and less curved on the left hemisphere than on the right.

It is also located near the Sylvian point.

The area lying around the Sylvian fissure is often referred to as the perisylvian cortex.

The human secondary somatosensory cortex (S2, SII) is a functionally defined region of cortex in the parietal operculum on the ceiling of the lateral sulcus.

== Discovery ==
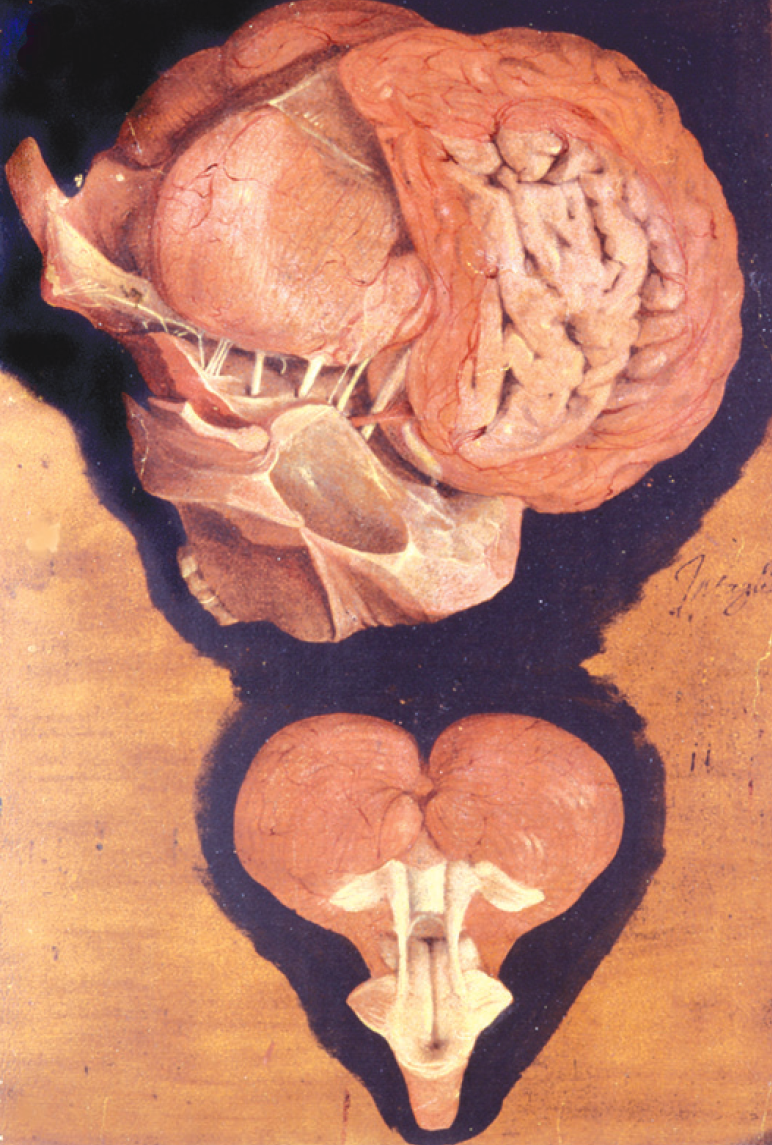
The first depiction of the lateral sulcus (in its top right side) in 1600 in the Tabulae Pictae 112.10 by Girolamo Fabrici d'Acquapendente.

The cerebral cortex was not depicted in a realistic manner until the 17th century with the Sylvian fissure being first accurately painted by Girolamo Fabrici d'Acquapendente in 1600 to provide plates for his Tabulae Pictae.

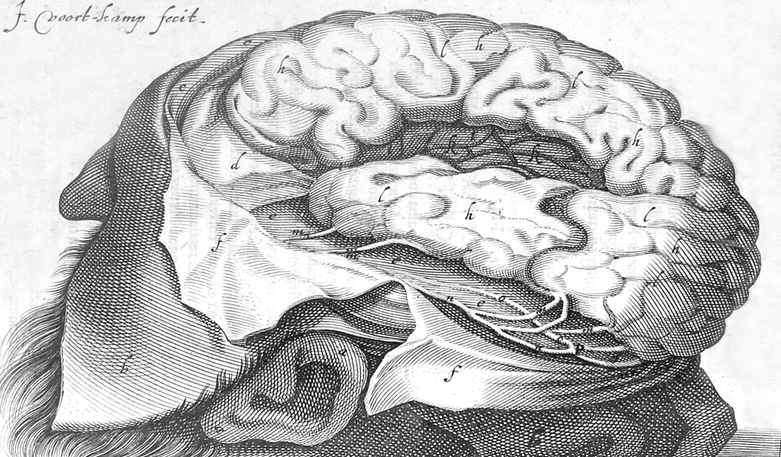
The engraving by J. Voort Kamp published in Casp. Bartolini Institutiones Anatomicae in 1641 which led to the lateral sulcus being named after Franciscus Sylvius

Its first description is traditionally taken to be in 1641, possibly by Caspar Bartholin, where its discovery was attributed to Franciscus Sylvius (1614–1672), professor of medicine at Leiden University, in the book Casp. Bartolini Institutiones Anatomicae where it is noted that "F.S. [F.S. probably refers to Franciscus Sylvius] If you examine the indentations which are represented in Figure 5 quite attentively, you will notice that they are very deep and that the brain is divided from one side to the other by the 'anfractuosa fissura,' which starts in the front part near the ocular roots, and from there moves backwards above the base of the spinal cord, following the temporal bones, and it divides the upper part of the brain from the lower."

However, as Caspar Bartholin died in 1629 and Franciscus Sylvius only started medicine in 1632, it seems likely that these words were written either by Caspar's son Thomas Bartholin (a theory supported by the subtitle of Casp. Bartolini Institutiones Anatomicae: "to which the author’s son has added the new theories and observation of subsequent scholars [many of which, as of today, have not been published yet], as well as some illustrations"), or by Franciscus Sylvius himself. In the book's preface, dated 1640, Thomas writes "We can all measure the nobility of Sylvius’s brain and talent by the marvelous, new structure of the brain" and "In the new images of the brain, the engraver followed the design and scalpel of the most thorough Franciscus Sylvius, to whom we owe, in this part, everything that the brain has the most, or the most wonderful of". Thomas was also a student of Sylvius when he taught at Leiden, beginning in 1638. Additionally, in 1663 Sylvius, in his Disputationem Medicarum, described the lateral fissure: "Particularly noticeable is the deep fissure or hiatus which begins at the roots of the eyes (oculorum radices) . . . it runs posteriorly above the temples as far as the roots of the brain stem (medulla radices). . . . It divides the cerebrum into an upper, larger part and a lower, smaller part".

== In popular culture ==
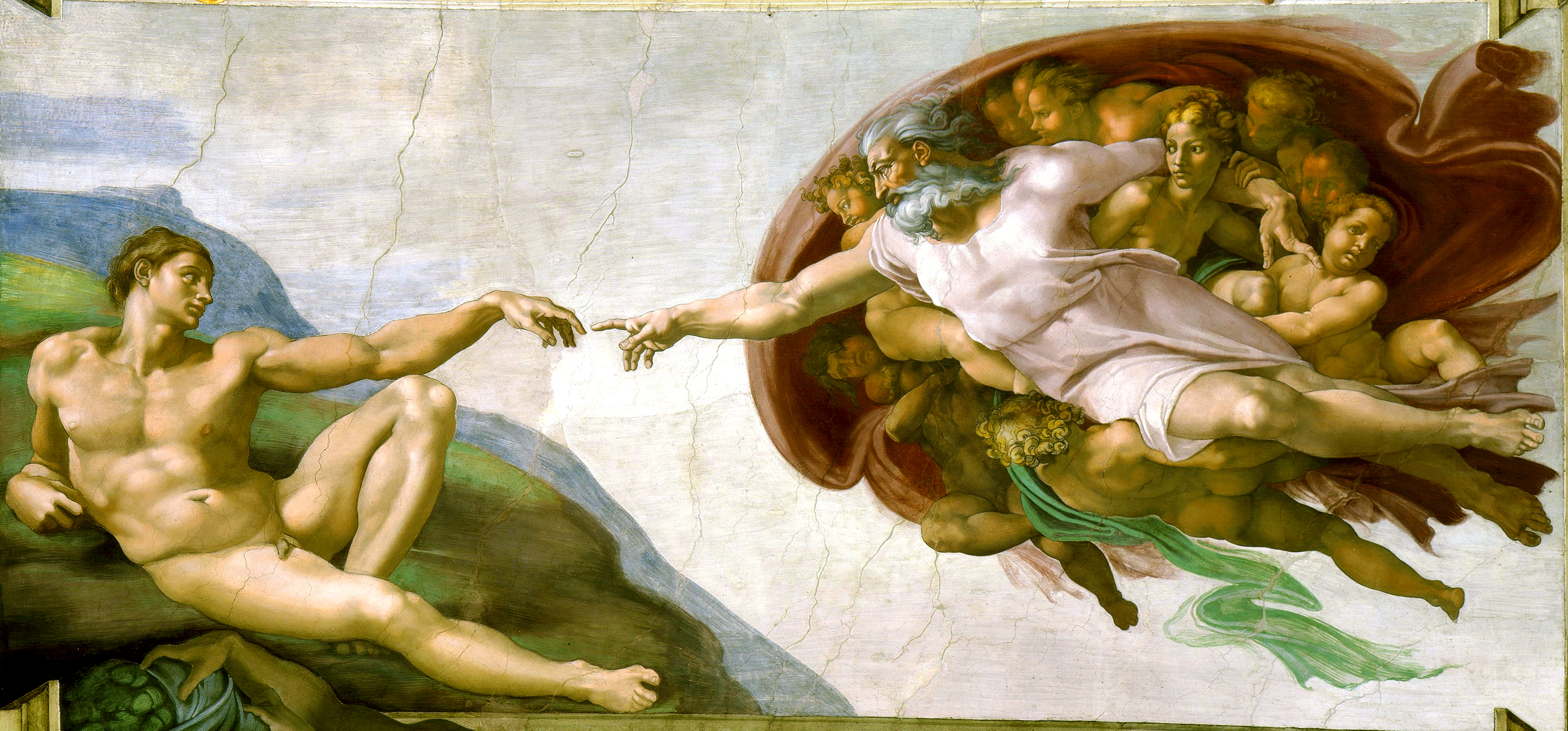
Right: Red cloak as lateral view of the human brain

Pop musician David Bowie referred to psychologist Carl Jung as "...crashing out with Sylvian" in his lyrics to "Drive-In Saturday" released on his 1973 album Aladdin Sane. In 2015, artist Tanja Stark suggested Bowie had drawn a cryptic link between Jung's waking hallucinatory visions (see The Red Book) and the Sylvian fissure, a region discovered by that time to produce hallucinogenic visions and ‘paranormal’ perceptions when electrically stimulated and, presciently in 2006, to generate what neurologists called an ‘illusory shadow person’ or doppelgänger phenomenon; themselves highly charged and recurring Bowie archetypes (Penfield 1955; Arzy et al., 2006). Stark notes another song on that album "Oh! You Pretty Things" sings of the hallucinatory spectre of .."a crack in the sky and a hand reaching down to me", evoking the iconic imagery of Michelangelo's painting The Creation of Adam. Stark observes that the American Medical Journal reported that Michelangelo's The Creation of Adam appears to conform deliberately to the neuroanatomical shape of the brain, its Sylvian fissure clearly evident, suggesting Michelangelo may have intentionally conflated theology with neurology ( Meshberger 1990: 1837). Others though, have likened the cloak to the uterus and umbilical cord.

== Additional images ==
Lateral sulcus shown in red (animation)
