= Agraphia =

Loss of ability to write

Agraphia is an acquired neurological disorder causing a loss in the ability to communicate through writing, either due to some form of motor dysfunction or an inability to spell. The loss of writing ability may present with other language or neurological disorders; disorders appearing commonly with agraphia are alexia, aphasia, dysarthria, agnosia, acalculia and apraxia. The study of individuals with agraphia may provide more information about the pathways involved in writing, both language related and motoric. Agraphia cannot be directly treated, but individuals can learn techniques to help regain and rehabilitate some of their previous writing abilities. These techniques differ depending on the type of agraphia.

Agraphia can be broadly divided into central and peripheral categories. Central agraphias typically involve language areas of the brain, causing difficulty spelling or with spontaneous communication, and are often accompanied by other language disorders. Peripheral agraphias usually target motor and visuospatial skills in addition to language and tend to involve motoric areas of the brain, causing difficulty in the movements associated with writing. Central agraphia may also be called aphasic agraphia as it involves areas of the brain whose major functions are connected to language and writing; peripheral agraphia may also be called nonaphasic agraphia as it involves areas of the brain whose functions are not directly connected to language and writing (typically motor areas).

The history of agraphia dates to the mid-fourteenth century, but it was not until the second half of the nineteenth century that it sparked significant clinical interest. Research in the twentieth century focused primarily on aphasiology in patients with lesions from strokes.

== Characteristics ==
Agraphia or impairment in producing written language can occur in many ways and many forms because writing involves many cognitive processes (language processing, spelling, visual perception, visuospatial orientation for graphic symbols, motor planning, and motor control of handwriting).

Agraphia has two main subgroupings: central ("aphasic") agraphia and peripheral ("nonaphasic") agraphia. Central agraphias include lexical, phonological, deep, and semantic agraphia. Peripheral agraphias include allographic, apraxic, motor execution, hemianoptic and afferent agraphia.

=== Central ===
Central agraphia occurs when there are both impairments in spoken language and impairments to the various motor and visualization skills involved in writing. Individuals who have agraphia with fluent aphasia write a normal quantity of well-formed letters, but lack the ability to write meaningful words. Receptive aphasia is an example of fluent aphasia. Those who have agraphia with nonfluent aphasia can write brief sentences, but their writing is difficult to read. Their writing requires great physical effort, lacks proper syntax, and often has poor spelling. Expressive aphasia is an example of nonfluent aphasia. Individuals who have alexia with agraphia have difficulty with both the production and comprehension of written language. This form of agraphia does not impair spoken language.

- Deep agraphia affects an individual's phonological ability and orthographic memory. Deep agraphia is often the result of a lesion involving the left parietal region (supramarginal gyrus or insula). Individuals can neither remember how words look when spelled correctly, nor sound them out to determine spelling. Individuals typically rely on their damaged orthographic memory to spell; this results in frequent errors, usually semantic in nature. Individuals have more difficulty with abstract concepts and uncommon words. Reading and spoken language are often impaired as well.
- Gerstmann syndrome agraphia is the impairment of written language production associated with the following structural symptoms: difficulty discriminating between one's own fingers, difficulty distinguishing left from right, and difficulty performing calculations. All four of these symptoms result from pathway lesions. Gerstmann's syndrome may additionally be present with alexia and mild aphasia.
- Global agraphia also impairs an individual's orthographic memory although to a greater extent than deep agraphia. In global apraxia, spelling knowledge is lost to such a degree that the individual can only write very few meaningful words, or cannot write any words at all. Reading and spoken language are also markedly impaired.
- Lexical and structural agraphia are caused by damage to the orthographic memory; these individuals cannot visualize the spelling of a word, though they do retain the ability to sound them out. This impaired spelling memory can imply the loss or degradation of the knowledge or just an inability to efficiently access it. There is a regularity effect associated with lexical agraphia in that individuals are less likely to correctly spell words without regular, predictable spellings. Additionally, spelling ability tends to be less impaired for common words. Individuals also have difficulty with homophones. Language competence in terms of grammar and sentence writing tends to be preserved.
- Phonological agraphia is the opposite of lexical agraphia in that the ability to sound out words is impaired, but the orthographical memory of words may be intact. It is associated with a lexicality effect by a difference in the ability to spell words versus nonwords; individuals with this form of agraphia are depending on their orthographic memory. Additionally, it is often harder for these individuals to access more abstract words without strong semantic representations (i.e., it is more difficult for them to spell prepositions than concrete nouns).
- Pure agraphia is the impairment in written language production without any other language or cognitive disorder.

Agraphia can occur separately or co-occur and can be caused by damage to the angular gyrus.

=== Peripheral ===
Peripheral agraphias occurs when there is damage to the various motor and visualization skills involved in writing.

- Apraxic agraphia is the impairment in written language production associated with disruption of the motor system. It results in distorted, slow, effortful, incomplete, and/or imprecise letter formation. Though written letters are often so poorly formed that they are almost illegible, the ability to spell aloud is often retained. This form of agraphia is caused specifically by a loss of specialized motor plans for the formation of letters and not by any dysfunction affecting the writing hand. Apraxic agraphia may present with or without ideomotor apraxia. Paralysis, chorea, Parkinson's disease (micrographia), and dystonia (writer's cramp) are motor disorders commonly associated with agraphia.
- Hysterical agraphia is the impairment in written language production caused by a conversion disorder.
- Reiterative agraphia is found in individuals who repeat letters, words, or phrases in written language production an abnormal number of times. Perseveration, paragraphia, and echographia are examples of reiterative agraphia.
- Visuospatial agraphia is the impairment in written language production defined by a tendency to neglect one portion (often an entire side) of the writing page, slanting lines upward or downward, and abnormal spacing between letters, syllables, and words. The orientation and correct sequencing of the writing will also be impaired. Visuospatial agraphia is frequently associated with left hemispatial neglect, difficulty in building or assembling objects, and other spatial difficulties.

== Causes ==
Agraphia has a multitude of causes ranging from strokes, lesions, traumatic brain injury, and dementia. Twelve regions of the brain are associated with handwriting. The four distinct functional areas are the left superior frontal area composed of the middle frontal gyrus and the superior frontal sulcus, the left superior parietal area composed of the inferior parietal lobule, the superior parietal lobule and the intraparietal sulcus and lastly the primary motor cortex and the somatosensory cortex. The eight other areas are considered associative areas and are the right anterior cerebellum, the left posterior nucleus of the thalamus, the left inferior frontal gyrus, the right posterior cerebellum, the right superior frontal cortex, the right inferior parietal lobule, the left fusiform gyrus and the left putamen. The specific type of agraphia resulting from brain damage will depend on which area of the brain was damaged.

Diagram of human brain showing surface gyri and the primary auditory cortex Angular gyrus Supramarginal gyrus Broca's area Wernicke's area Primary auditory cortex

Phonological agraphia is linked to damage in areas of the brain involved in phonological processing skills (sounding out words), specifically the language areas around the sylvian fissure, such as Broca's area, Wernicke's area, and the supramarginal gyrus.

Lexical agraphia is associated with damage to the left angular gyrus and/or posterior temporal cortex. The damage is typically posterior and inferior to the perisylvian language areas.

Deep agraphia involves damage to the same areas of the brain as lexical agraphia plus some damage to the perisylvian language areas as well. More extensive left hemisphere damage can lead to global agraphia.

Gerstmann's syndrome is caused by a lesion of the dominant (usually the left) parietal lobe, usually an angular gyrus lesion.

Apraxic agraphia with ideomotor apraxia is typically caused by damage to the superior parietal lobe (where graphomotor plans are stored) or the premotor cortex (where the plans are converted into motor commands). Additionally, some individuals with cerebellar lesions (more typically associated with non-apraxic motor dysfunction) develop apraxic agraphia. Apraxic agraphia without ideomotor apraxia may be caused by damage to either of the parietal lobes, the dominant frontal lobe, or to the dominant thalamus.

Visuospatial agraphia typically has a right hemisphere pathology. Damage to the right frontal area of the brain may cause more motor defects, whereas damage to the posterior part of the right hemisphere leads predominantly to spatial defects in writing.

=== Alzheimer's disease ===
Agraphia is often seen in association with Alzheimer's disease (AD). Writing disorders can be an early manifestation of AD. In individuals with AD, the first sign pertaining to writing skills is the selective syntactic simplification of their writing. Individuals will write with less description, detail and complexity, and other markers, such as grammatical errors, may emerge. Different agraphias may develop as AD progresses. In the beginning stages of AD, individuals show signs of allographic agraphia and apraxic agraphia. Allographic agraphia is represented in AD individuals by the mixing of lower and upper case letters in words; apraxic agraphia is represented in AD patients through poorly constructed or illegible letters and omission or over repetition of letter strokes. As their AD progresses, so does the severity of their agraphia; they may begin to form spatial agraphia, which is the inability to write in a straight horizontal line, and there are often unnecessary gaps between letters and words.

A connection between AD and agraphia is the role of memory in normal writing ability. Normal spellers have access to a lexical spelling system that uses a whole-word; when functioning properly, it allows for recall of the spelling of a complete word, not as individual letters or sounds. This system further uses an internal memory store where the spellings of hundreds of words are kept. This is called the graphemic output lexicon and is aptly named in relation to the graphemic buffer, which is the short term memory loop for many of the functions involved in handwriting. When the spelling system cannot be used, such as with unfamiliar words, non-words or words that we do not recognize the spelling for, some people are able to use the phonological process called the sub-lexical spelling system. This system is used to sound out a word and spell it. In AD individuals, memory stores that are used for everyday handwriting are lost as the disease progresses.

== Management ==
Agraphia cannot be directly treated, but individuals can be rehabilitated to regain some of their previous writing abilities.

For the management of phonological agraphia, individuals are trained to memorize key words, such as a familiar name or object, that can then help them form the grapheme for that phoneme. Management of allographic agraphia can be as simple as having alphabet cards so the individual can write legibly by copying the correct letter shapes. There are few rehabilitation methods for apraxic agraphia; if the individual has considerably better hand control and movement with typing than they do with handwriting, then they can use technological devices. Texting and typing do not require the same technical movements that handwriting does; for these technological methods, only spatial location of the fingers to type is required. If copying skills are preserved in an individual with apraxic agraphia, repeated copying may help shift from the highly intentional and monitored hand movements indicative of apraxic agraphia to a more automated control.

Micrographia is a condition that can occur with the development of other disorders, such as Parkinson's disease, and is when handwriting becomes illegible because of small writing. For some individuals, a simple command to write bigger eliminates the issue.

- Anagram and Copy Treatment (ACT) uses the arrangement of component letters of target words and then repeated copying of the target word. This is similar to the CART; the main difference is that the target words for ACT are specific to the individual. Target words that are important in the life of the individual are emphasized because people with deep or global agraphias do not typically have the same memory for the words as other people with agraphia may. Writing can be even more important to these people as it can cue spoken language. ACT helps in this by facilitating the relearning of a set of personally relevant written words for use in communication.
- Copy and Recall Treatment (CART) method helps to reestablish the ability to spell specific words that are learned through repeated copying and recall of target words. CART is more likely to be successful in treating lexical agraphia when a few words are trained to mastery than when a large group of unrelated words is trained. Words chosen can be individualized to the patient, which makes treatment more personalized.
- Graphemic buffer uses the training of specific words to improve spelling. Cueing hierarchies and copy and recall method of specific words are used, to work the words into the short-term memory loop, or graphemic buffer. The segmentation of longer words into shorter syllables helps bring words into short-term memory.
- Problem solving approach is used as a self-correcting method for phonological errors. The individual sounds out the word and attempts to spell it, typically using an electronic dictionary-type device that indicates correct spelling. This method takes advantage of the preserved sound-to-letter correspondences when they are intact. This approach may improve access to spelling memory, strengthen orthographic representations, or both.

== History ==
In 1553 Thomas Wilson's book Arte of Rhetorique held the earliest known description of what would now be called acquired agraphia. In the second half of the nineteenth century, the loss of the ability to produce written language received clinical attention, when ideas about localization in the brain influenced studies about dissociation between written and spoken language as well as reading and writing. Paul Broca's work on aphasia during this time inspired researchers across Europe and North America to begin conducting studies on the correlation between lesions and loss of function in various cortical areas.

During the 1850s, clinicians such as Armand Trousseau and John Hughlings Jackson held the prevailing view that the same linguistic deficiency occurred in writing as well as speech and reading impairments. In 1856, Louis-Victor Marcé argued that written and spoken language were independent of each other; he discovered that in many patients with languages disorders, both speech and writing was impaired. The recovery of written and spoken language was not always parallel suggesting that these two modes of expression were independent. He believed the ability to write not only involved motor control, but also the memory of the signs and their meaning.

In 1867, William Ogle, who coined the term agraphia, made several key observations about the patterns of dissociation found in written and spoken language. He demonstrated that some patients with writing impairments were able to copy written letters but struggled arranging the letters to form words. Ogle knew that aphasia and agraphia often occurred together, but he confirmed that the impairment of two different types of language (spoken and written) can vary in type and severity. Although Ogle's review helped make important advancements toward understanding writing disorders, a documented case of pure agraphia was missing.

In 1884, over two decades after the research of acquired language disorders began, Albert Pitres made an important contribution when he published a clinical report of pure agraphia. According to Pitres, Marcé and Ogle were the first to emphasize the dissociation between speech and writing. His work was also strongly influenced by Théodule-Armand Ribot's modular approach to memory. Pitres's clinical case study in 1884 argues for the localization of writing in the brain.

Pitres's reading and writing models consisted of three main components: visual (the memory for letters and how letters are put together to form syllables and word), auditory (the memory for the sounds of each letter), and motor (motor-graphic memory of the letters). He proposed the following classifications of agraphia:

1. Agraphia by word blindness: inability to copy a model, but the individual can write spontaneously and in response to dictation.
2. Agraphia by word deafness: inability to write to dictation, but the individual can copy a model and write spontaneously.
3. Motor agraphia: no ability to write, but the individual can spell.

Pitres said in aphasia, the intellect is not systematically impaired.

Research in the twentieth century focused primarily on aphasiology in patients with lesions from cerebrovascular accidents. From these studies, researches gained significant insight into the complex cognitive process of producing written language.

== See also ==
- Alexia without agraphia
- Dysgraphia
- Lists of language disorders
