= Neuroanatomy of memory =

Variety of structures in the brain related to memory

The neuroanatomy of memory encompasses a wide variety of anatomical structures in the brain.

== Subcortical structures ==
=== Hippocampus ===
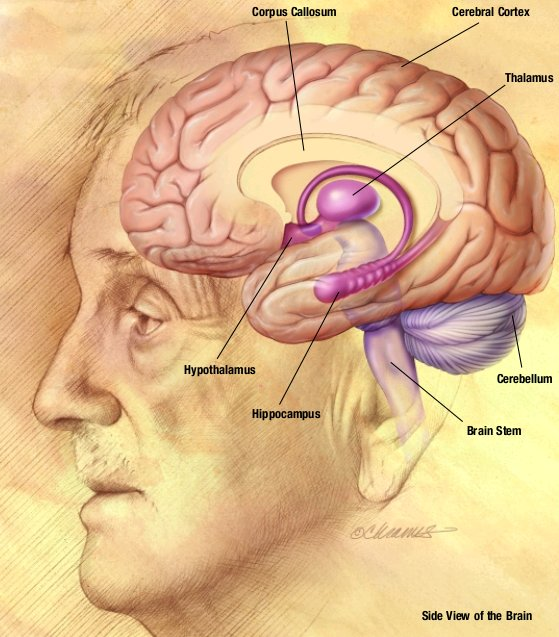
The hippocampus

The hippocampus is a structure in the brain that has been associated with various memory functions. It is part of the limbic system, and lies next to the medial temporal lobe. It is made up of two structures, the Ammon's Horn, and the Dentate gyrus, each containing different types of cells.

==== Cognitive maps ====
There is evidence that the hippocampus contains cognitive maps in humans. In one study, single-cell recordings were taken from electrodes implanted in a rat's hippocampus, and it was found that certain neurons responded strongly only when the rat was in certain locations. These cells are called place cells, and collections of these cells can be considered to be mental maps. Individual place cells do not only respond to one unique area only however, the patterns of activation of these cells overlap to form layered mental maps within the hippocampus. A good analogy is the example of the same television or computer screen pixels being used to light up any trillions of possible combinations to produce images, just as the place cells can be used in any multiple possible combinations to represent mental maps. The hippocampus' right side is more oriented towards responding to spatial aspects, whereas the left side is associated with other context information. Also, there is evidence that experience in building extensive mental maps, such as driving a city taxi for a long time (since this requires considerable memorization of routes), can increase the volume of one's hippocampus.

==== Encoding ====
Damage to the hippocampus and surrounding area can cause anterograde amnesia, the inability to form new memories. This implies that the hippocampus is important not only for storing cognitive maps, but for encoding memories.

The hippocampus is also involved in memory consolidation, the slow process by which memories are converted from short to long term memory. This is supported by studies in which lesions are applied to rat hippocampi at different times after learning. The process of consolidation may take up to a couple years.

It has also been found that it is possible to form new semantic memories without the hippocampus, but not episodic memories, which means that explicit descriptions of actual events (episodic) cannot be learned, but some meaning and knowledge is gained from experiences (semantic).

=== Cerebellum ===
The cerebellum

The cerebellum ("little brain") is a structure located at the rear of the brain, near the spinal cord. It looks like a miniature version of the cerebral cortex, in that it has a wavy, or convoluted surface.

Unlike the hippocampus which is involved in the encoding of complex memories, the cerebellum plays a role in the learning of procedural memory, and motor learning, such as skills requiring co-ordination and fine motor control. An example of a skill requiring procedural memory would be playing a musical instrument, or driving a car or riding a bike. Individuals with transient global amnesia that have difficulty forming new memories and/or remembering old events may sometimes retain the ability to perform complex musical pieces, suggesting that procedural memory is completely dissociated from conscious memory, also known as explicit memory.

This separation makes sense if the cerebellum, which is far removed from the hippocampus, is responsible for procedural learning. The cerebellum is more generally involved in motor learning, and damage to it can result in problems with movement, specifically it is considered to co-ordinate timing and accuracy of movements, and to make long-term changes (learning) to improve these skills.

=== Amygdala ===
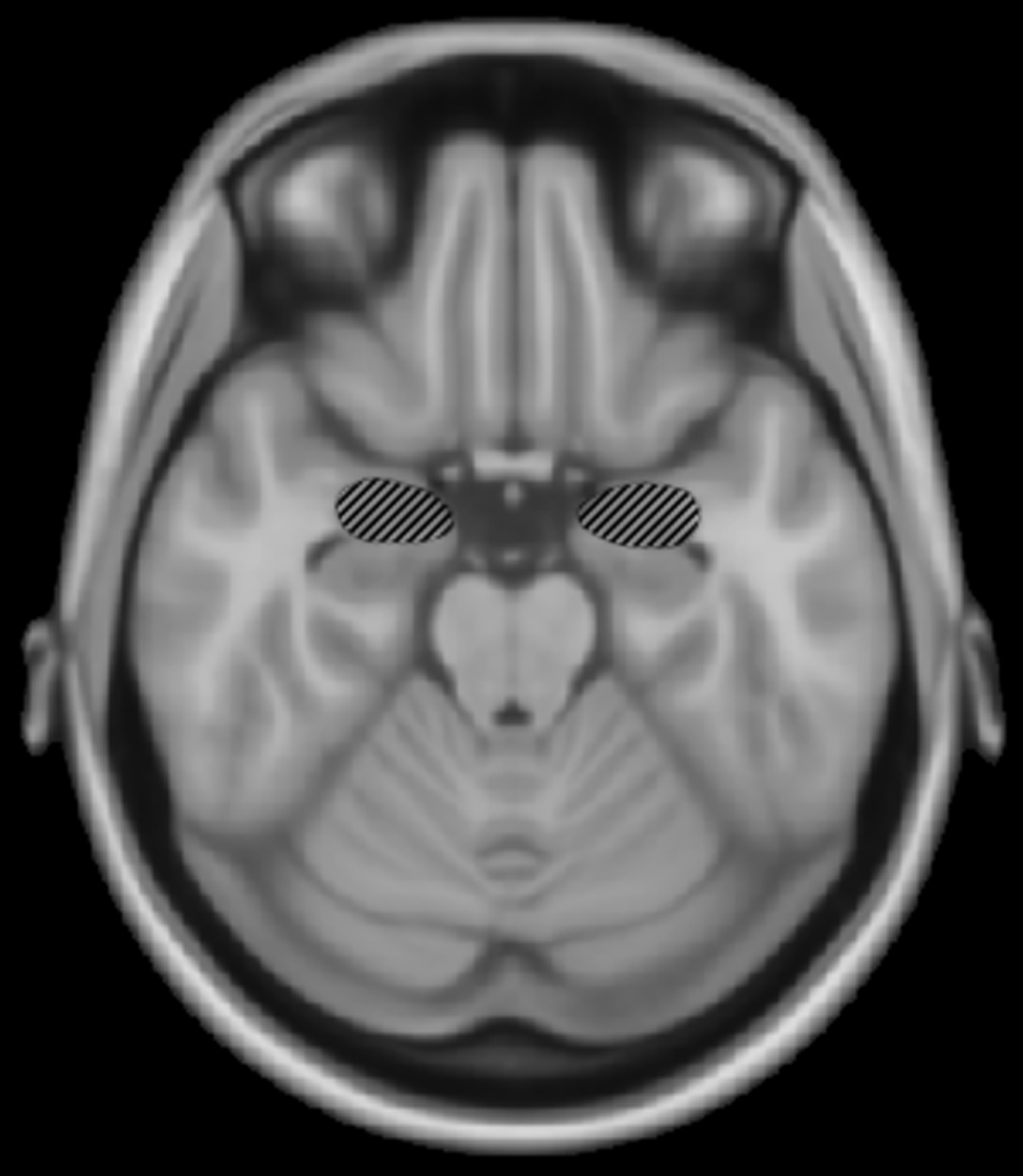
The amygdala.

Located above the hippocampus in the medial temporal lobes are two amygdalae (singular "amygdala"). The amygdalae are associated with both emotional learning and memory, as it responds strongly to emotional stimuli, especially fear. These neurons assist in encoding emotional memories and enhancing them. This process results in emotional events being more deeply and accurately encoded into memory. Lesions to the amygdalae in monkeys have been shown to impair motivation, as well as the processing of emotions.

==== Memory of fear conditioning ====
Pavlovian conditioning tests have shown the active role of the amygdala in fear conditioning in rats. Research involving lesions to the basolateral nucleus have shown a strong association with memories involving fear. The central nucleus is linked with the behavioral responses that are dependent on the basolateral's reaction to fear. The central nucleus of the amygdala is also linked to emotions and behaviors motivated by food and sex.

==== Memory consolidation ====
Emotional experiences and events are somewhat fragile and take a while to be completely set into memory. This slow process, referred to as consolidation, allows emotions to influence the way the memory is stored.

The amygdala is involved in memory consolidation, which is the process of transferring information that is currently in working memory into ones long-term memory. This process is also known as memory modulation. The amygdala works to encode recent emotional information into memory. Memory research has shown that the greater ones emotional arousal level at the time of the event, the greater the chance that the event will be remembered. This may be due to the amygdala enhancing the emotional aspect of the information during encoding, causing the memory to be processed at a deeper level and therefore, more likely to withstand forgetting.

=== Basal ganglia and motor memory ===
Basal ganglia (red) and related structures (blue)

The basal ganglia are a group of nuclei which are located in the medial temporal lobe, above the thalamus and connected to the cerebral cortex. Specifically, the basal ganglia includes the subthalamic nucleus, substantia nigra, the globus pallidus, the ventral striatum and the dorsal striatum, which consists of the putamen and the caudate nucleus. The basic functions of these nuclei deal with cognition, learning, and motor control and activities. The basal ganglia are also associated with learning, memory, and unconscious memory processes, such as motor skills and implicit memory. Particularly, one division within the ventral striatum, the nucleus accumbens core, is involved in the consolidation, retrieval and reconsolidation of drug memory.

The caudate nucleus is thought to assist in learning and memory of associations taught during operant conditioning. Specifically, research has shown that this part of the basal ganglia plays a role in acquiring stimulus-response habits, as well as in solving sequence tasks.

Damage to the basal ganglia has been linked to dysfunctional learning of motor and perceptual-motor skills. Most disorders that are associated with damage to these areas of the brain involve some type of motor dysfunction, as well as trouble with mental switching between tasks in working memory. Such symptoms are often present in those who suffer from dystonia, athymhormic syndrome, Fahr's syndrome, Huntington's disease or Parkinson's disease. Huntington's and Parkinson's disease involve both motor deficits and cognitive impairment.

== Cortical structures ==
The cortical structures

=== Frontal lobe ===
The frontal lobes are located at the front of each cerebral hemisphere and positioned anterior to the parietal lobes. It is separated from the parietal lobe by the primary motor cortex, which controls voluntary movements of specific body parts associated with the precentral gyrus. The cortex here serves our ability to plan the day, organize work, type a letter, pay attention to details and control the movements of your arms and legs. It also contributed to your personality and behaviour.

When considering the frontal lobes in regards to memory, we see that it is very important in the coordination of information. Therefore, the frontal lobes are important in working memory. For example, when you are thinking about how to get to a mall you have never been to before, you combine various bits of knowledge you already have: the layout of the city the mall is in, information from a map, knowledge of traffic patterns in that area and conversations with your friends about the location of the mall. By actively using all of this information, you can determine the best route for you to take. This action involves the controlled use of information in working memory, coordinated by the frontal lobes.

The frontal lobes help a person select out memories that are most relevant on a given occasion. It can coordinate various types of information into a coherent memory trace. For example, the knowledge of the information itself, as well as knowing where information came from must be put together into a single memory representation; this is called source monitoring. Sometimes we experience situations where information becomes separated, such as when we recall something, but cannot remember where we remember it from; this is referred to as a source monitoring error.

The frontal lobes are also involved in the ability to remember what we need to do in the future; this is called prospective memory.

=== Temporal lobe ===
The temporal lobes are a region of the cerebral cortex that is located beneath the Sylvian fissure on both the left and right hemispheres of the brain. Lobes in this cortex are more closely associated with memory and in particular autobiographical memory.

The temporal lobes are also concerned with recognition memory. This is the capacity to identify an item as one that was recently encountered. Recognition memory is widely viewed as consisting of two components, a familiarity component (i.e. Do I know this person waving at me?) and a recollective component (i.e. That is my friend Julia, from evolutionary psychology class).

Damage to the temporal lobe can affect an individual in a litany of ways ranging from: disturbance of auditory sensation and perception, disturbance of selective attention of auditory and visual input, disorders of visual perception, impaired organization and categorization of verbal material, disturbance of language comprehension, and altered personality.

In regard to memory, temporal lobe damage can impair long-term memory. Thus, general semantic knowledge or more personal episodic memories of one's childhood could be affected.

=== Parietal lobe ===
The parietal lobe is located directly behind the central sulcus, superior to the occipital lobe and posterior to the frontal lobe, visually at the top of the back of the head. The make up of the parietal lobe is defined by four anatomical boundaries in the brain, providing a division of all the four lobes.

The parietal lobe has many functions and duties in the brain and its main functioning can be divided down into two main areas: (1) sensation and perception (2) constructing a spatial coordinate system to represent the world around us. The parietal lobe helps us to mediate attention when necessary and provides spatial awareness and navigational skills. Also, it integrates all of our sensory information (touch, sight, pain etc.) to form a single perception. Parietal lobe gives the ability to focus our attention on different stimuli at the same time, PET scans show high activity in the parietal lobe when participates being studied were asked to focus their attention at two separate areas of attention. Parietal lobe also assists with verbal short term memory and damage to the supramarginal gyrus cause short term memory loss.

Damage to the parietal lobe results in the syndrome 'neglect' which is when patients treat part of their body or objects in their visual field as though it never existed. Damage to the left side of the parietal lobe can result in what is called Gerstmann syndrome. It includes right-left confusion, difficulty with writing (agraphia) and difficulty with mathematics (acalculia). It can also produce disorders of language (aphasia) and the inability to perceive objects. Damage to the right parietal lobe can result in neglecting part of the body or space (contralateral neglect), which can impair many self-care skills such as dressing and washing. Right side damage can also cause difficulty in making things (constructional apraxia), denial of deficits (anosognosia) and drawing ability. Neglect syndrome tends to be more prevalent on the right side of the parietal lobe, because the right mediates attention to both the left and right fields. Damage in the somatic sensory cortex results in loss of perception of bodily sensations, namely sense of touch.

=== Occipital lobe ===
The occipital lobe is the smallest of all four lobes in the human cerebral cortex and located in the rearmost part of the skull and considered to be part of the forebrain. The occipital lobe sits directly above the cerebellum and is situated posterior to the Parieto-occipital sulcus, or parieto-occipital sulcus. This lobe is known as the centre of the visual perception system, the main function of the occipital lobe is that of vision.

Retinal sensors send signals through the optic tract to the Lateral geniculate nucleus. Once the Lateral Geniculate Nucleus receives the information it is sent down the primary visual cortex where it is organized and sent down one of two possible path ways; dorsal or ventral stream. The ventral stream is responsible for object representation and recognition and is also commonly known as the "what" stream. The dorsal stream is responsible for guiding our actions and recognizing where objects are in space, commonly known as the "where" or "how" stream. Once in the information is organized and sent through the pathways it continues to the other areas of the brain responsible for visual processing.

The most important function of the Occipital lobe is vision. Due to the positioning of this lobe at the back of the head it is not susceptible to much injury but any significant damage to the brain can cause a variety of damage to our visual perception system. Common problems in the occipital lobe are field defects and scotomas, movement and colour discrimination, hallucinations, illusions, inability to recognize words and inability to recognize movement. A study was done in which patients suffered from a tumour on the occipital lobe and the results shows that the most frequent consequence was contralateral damage to the visual field. When damage occurs in the occipital lobe it is most common to see the effects on the opposite side of the brain. Since the brain regions are so specialized in their functioning, damages done to specific areas of the brain can cause specific type of damage. Damage to the left side of the brain can lead to language discrepancies, i.e. difficulty in properly identifying letters, numbers and words, inability to incorporate visual stimuli to comprehend multiple ways an object can be found. Right side damage causes non-verbal problems, i.e. identifying geometric shapes, perception of figures and faces. In almost all regions of the brain left side damage leads to general language problems whereas right side damage leads to general perception and problem solving skills.

=== Damage to the cortex ===
Many studies of different disease and disorders that have symptoms of memory loss have provided reinforcing evidence to the study of the anatomy of the brain and which parts are more utilized in memory.

==== Frontotemporal lobar degeneration and memory ====
Frontotemporal lobar degeneration (FTLD) is a common form of dementia due to the degeneration of the frontal and temporal lobes. Studies have found significant decreases in the essential needs for proper functioning in these lobes. The autobiographical domain in memory is largely affected by this disease. In one study, FTLD patients were interviewed and asked to describe a significant event from five different periods of their lives. Using the interview and different methods of imaging, the experimenters hoped to find links between patterns of brain volume loss and performance in the interview.

Through image processing, patterns of significant reduced parenchymal volumes that encompass the frontal and temporal lobes were found. Through comparison to a control group of patients it was found that parenchymal volumes increased during episodic recall, and decreased during semantic recall. The experimenters discussed that lifespan autobiographical episodic recall was largely damaged in FTLD patients and semantic autobiographical memory seemed to be spared.

==== Parkinson's disease and memory ====
Parkinson's disease involves both damage to the basal ganglia and certain memory dysfunctions, suggesting that the basal ganglia are involved in specific types of memory. Those who have this disease have problems with both their working memory and spatial memory.

Most people can instantly and easily use visual-spatial memory to remember locations and pictures, but a person with Parkinson's disease would find this difficult. He or she would also have trouble encoding this visual and spatial information into long-term memory. This suggests that the basal ganglia work in both encoding and recalling spatial information.

People with Parkinson's disease display working memory impairment during sequence tasks and tasks involving events in time. They also have difficulty in knowing how to use their memory, such as when to change strategies or maintain a train of thought.
