= Amorphosynthesis =

Amorphosynthesis, also called a hemi-sensory deficit, is a neuropsychological condition in which a patient experiences unilateral inattention to sensory input. This phenomenon is frequently associated with damage to the right cerebral hemisphere resulting in severe sensory deficits that are observed on the contralesional (left) side of the body. A right-sided deficit is less commonly observed and the effects are reported to be temporary and minor. Evidence suggests that the right cerebral hemisphere has a dominant role in attention and awareness to somatic sensations through ipsilateral and contralateral stimulation. In contrast, the left cerebral hemisphere is activated only by contralateral stimuli. Thus, the left and right cerebral hemispheres exhibit redundant processing to the right-side of the body and a lesion to the left cerebral hemisphere can be compensated by the ipsiversive processes of the right cerebral hemisphere. For this reason, right-sided amorphosynthesis is less often observed and is generally associated with bilateral lesions.

== Anatomy ==
Brain areas in the parietal lobes play an integral role in processing and interpreting somatic sensations from the body or environment. The right parietal lobe is associated with sensory integration and perception whereas the left parietal lobe is believed to function at a more conceptual level involving speech, reading and writing. The central sulcus divides the frontal lobe from the parietal lobe which is located superior to the occipital lobe and posterior to the frontal lobe. The primary somatosensory cortex- the main processing center for tactile sensations- is positioned posterior to the central sulcus, on the post-central gyrus. The somatosensory system is also associated with the perception of temperature, taste, vision, proprioception and kinesthesia. Sensory receptors that are spread throughout the body [skin, organs, muscles, etc.] send sensory input signals to the cortex via sensory afferent neurons. The parietal lobes then act as a main determinant for the summation of stimuli and spatial awareness. In research by Denny-Brown and Banker, a disturbance in the physiological process of perceiving somatic sensations was termed amorphosynthesis. This concept was associated with lesions of the parietal lobe leading to the ineffectual processing of sensory stimulus on the opposite side of the lesion.

== Causes ==
Amorphosynthesis is most closely related to damage of the right parietal lobe but instances of left parietal and bilateral damage have also been reported. The inattention to or suppression of somatic sensations on the contralesional side of the body can manifest in the cerebral processing centers that produce the sensory modalities for touch, taste, vision, smell, and proprioception. This phenomenon is frequently associated with other unilateral conditions such as hemispatial neglect, metamorphognosia, hemiplegia, hemisomatognosia, kinesthetic hallucination, anosognosia, balint optic ataxia, anaesthoagnosia and apraxia. The causes of cerebral brain damage to either hemisphere can include traumatic brain injury, stroke, infection, surgery or a tumor.

Causes of Amorphosynthesis are:

- Cerebrovascular accidents that have affected cerebral hemispheres, such as occlusion of the right middle cerebral artery.
- Diffused brain lesion and lesions on other parts of the central nervous system (CNS).

== Types ==
The amorphosynthesis of sensory stimuli is associated with different perceptual and conceptual effects relative to the severity of damage to the parietal lobe. The degree of sensory suppression has been explored with bilateral and ipsilateral double stimulation methods in patients with either extensive or superficial parietal lesions. Complete extinction is commonly observed in which patients with extensive right parietal damage show complete and constant inattention to tactile stimuli on the contralesional side of the body. Incomplete extinction is frequently associated with lesions that are less extensive or superficial in nature. This phenomenon is supported by studies showing that if two stimuli are simultaneously applied to both sides of the body, the patient [with their eyes closed] will ignore the stimulus that is applied to the affected side and report a tactile sensation from the unaffected side alone. If each side of the body is separately stimulated, then each stimulus is correctly reported without delay. Incomplete sensory suppression has also been observed using ipsilateral double stimulation to one side of the body. Results indicate that stimulation to a proximal and distal segment [for example, the face and hand] on one side of the body will result in a distal [hand] stimulus suppression, to which the patient will report feeling only the proximal [face] stimulation. Further evidence suggests that the parietal lobe gives rise to the processing of attention and awareness that is necessary for sensory perception. In studies of double stimulation in which the patient has their eyes open, incomplete extinction is eliminated when attention is directed to the application of stimulus on the affected side. This phenomenon is not observed in patients with complete extinction in which there is extensive damage to the parietal lobe, suggesting that the subsequent sensory suppression is not affected by expectant attention

Subtypes of amorphosynthesis, depending on the type of deficit, have been referred to as tactile amorphosynthesis, visual amorphosynthesis, and amorphosynthetic apraxia of speech or writing

== Treatment ==
Treatment of amorphosynthesis is often carried out by a variety of clinicians, neuropsychologists, physical therapists, occupational therapists, caretakers, speech-language pathologists and optometrists, depending on the severity and type of sensory suppression. Rehabilitation consists of developing an individualized treatment plan that is designed to help the person address the deficits that are affecting them. Trained professions can help to improve communication and are primarily advised to direct attention to the contralesional [affected] side of the body. Although not all deficits have seen improvements after therapy, evidence suggests that many patients are able to live independently following treatment implementation

== Signs and symptoms ==
S. Fazlullah, in his article Tactile Perceptual and Tactile-Amorphosynthesis in the Localization of Cerebral Lesions (1956), provides a detailed explanation of the specific signs and symptoms in amorphosynthesis caused by left and right parietal lobe lesions.

=== Left Parietal Lobe Lesion ===
Gerstmann syndrome:

- A patient is unable to recognize his/her finger.
- A patient is unable to differentiate right from left.
- A patient makes mistakes while writing.
- A patient is unable to name things.

Parietal apraxia:

- A patient is unable to understand or execute actions.

Constructional apraxia:

- A patient has trouble drawing.

=== Right Parietal Lobe Lesion ===
Anosognosia

- A patient cannot perceive a defective function such as hemiplegia, or paralysis of one side of the body.

Hemiasomatognosia

- A patient cannot focus attention on the left side of the body and believes that this side of the body feels “strange.”

Metamorphognosia

- A patient perceives part of the body as too heavy or thick.

Corporeal agnosia

- A patient loses sensation in the left side of the body and mistakenly believes that an extremity has been lost.

Phantom Sensations

- A patient believes that a part of the body has doubled.

Transposition of Parts of the Body

- A patient neglects the left side of the body, always performing actions with her right and searching for her left extremities in places other than the hospital bed, such as a locker.

Constructional apraxia

- When asked to arrange, draw, or copy a simple model of one- to three-dimensional figures, a patient consistently neglects important details on the model's left side. For example, when asked to draw a figure of a few matchsticks, the patient would only draw the matchsticks on the figure's right side.

Disorientation of space:

- A patient is unable recognize depth of space.

Agnosia of left portion of space:

- A patient is unable to perceive sensation on the left of her body.
- A patient is unable to see from the left eye.

Anaesthoagnosia:

- A patient has loss sensation on the left side of his/her body.

Balint optic ataxia:

- A patient is unable to see two things at once.
- A patient is unable to coordinate ocular movement.
- A patient is unable to see objects on the left peripheral field.

== Primary Research ==
=== Denny-Brown and Banker ===
According to Denny-Brown's 1954 article lesions of the parieto-occipital region cause disturbance of recognition in a patient – left-sided lesions usually cause agnosia, while right-sided lesions usually cause lack of recognition of the person's left side and extrapersonal space. Denny-Brown defines agnosia as a disorder in formation or use of symbolic concepts, such as recognizing body parts; in naming objects; in understanding numbers; or in understanding geographic and/or spatial location. It applies to both sides of a person, even though a lesion in only one side of the parietal lobe – the dominant one – causes it. He argues that amorphosynthesis, on the other hand, is usually caused by a lesion in the non-dominant parieto-occipital lobe and results in lack of awareness on the opposite side of the body.

Before Denny-Brown, researchers such as Lange, Dide, Lenz, and McFie and associates proposed that the brain's right hemisphere controls a specific function in spatial perception, explaining why damage to the parieto-occipital lobe of the right hemisphere results in the loss of spatial perception. In his article, Denny-Brown alternately proposes that lesions of the parieto-occipital lobe cause errors in spatial summation, not spatial perception. By using a case study, he argues that amorphosynthesis actually may result from lesions of either side of the parietal lobe, depending on the patient's dominant hemisphere. He further argues that lesions in the dominant lobe cause both amorphosynthesis and agnosia – the agnosia just obscures the amorphosynthesis.

=== Fazlullah ===
According to Fazlullah's article bilateral simultaneous and ipsilateral double stimuli in testing cutaneous (skin) sensations can help study the sensory suppression phenomenon called Tactile-Amorphosynthesis.

=== Cherington and Yarnell ===
According to Cherington and Yarnell's article The game of chess can be used as a tool to study the visual perception of subjects who have a dominant hemisphere infarction, for that reason, it is useful to the understanding of the evolution of amorphosynthesis.

== Case Studies ==
=== Denny-Brown: Amorphosynthesis From Left Parietal Lesion ===
A 36 yr. old white married boilermaker named W.F. was admitted to the Boston City Hospital on March 23, 1953, after a week of general weakness and malaise. Three days before his admission, he developed a throbbing bilateral headache, and on the day of admission, he was unable to walk or support himself due to right-sided weakness. On the first day, his symptoms were severe – while he could perform simple movements of his right limbs, he did not feel pain, temperature, or touch on his right side and refused to acknowledge that his right limbs were his. In fact, he repeatedly threw his right arm from the hospital bed, believing that the arm did not belong to him.

On the second day, W.F. was transferred to a neurological division for further examination. Even though he had been right handed his entire life, he ate, wrote, and held a cigarette in his left hand. When asked to extend his arms or grab an object with his right hand, he repeatedly hyperextended the fingers on his right hand without being conscious of doing so. He also shaved with his left hand and only on the left half of his face, not realizing there was anything wrong with his actions.

When stimulated with pain, temperature, touch, and vibration, W.F. reported feeling these sensations on his right side but described them as “not as clear” as on the left. When both sides of his body were simultaneously stimulated, he was unable to distinguish sensation on his right side. Denny-Brown terms this phenomenon extinction, and for the first week, the patient's left side remained dominant over his right side. In addition, when stimulated by two points simultaneously on his right side, W.F. could not distinguish between them – the right side of his face was dominant over his right arm and leg, and his right leg over his right arm, throughout the first week.

Importantly, W.F. gave no evidence of agnosia. He expressed himself clearly, named objects well, had no trouble finding his way about the hospital, and could even draw maps of Boston, Massachusetts, and the USA fairly well. He was able to identify all the parts of his body and distinguish right from left on his own body, and his initial belief that his right arm belonged to somebody else ceased after the second day of hospitalization. But he still had difficulty perceiving the right side of his body – even on the 12th day, he would properly put his left hand into the sleeve of his shirt when dressing but simply drape the shirt around his right side, not realizing he had done so.

Even though left-sided lesions of the parieto-occipital lobe usually cause agnosia, W.F. appeared to have a left-sided lesion causing amorphosynthesis. Electroencephalograms, obtained on admission and a week later, showed focal slow waves in the left parietal and occipital leads, and the clinical diagnosis was a left anterior parietal lesion, most likely caused by a small hemorrhage in the brain.

In analyzing W.F., Denny-Brown raises the question of why the patient's left-sided lesion caused amorphosynthesis rather than agnosia. In general, as Denny-Brown explains in his introduction, left-sided lesions cause agnosia while right-sided lesions cause amorphosynthesis. He gives two possible explanations – first, that the right hemisphere might be dominant in the patient, not the left. This would suggest that just as right-handed and left-handedness differ among the population, so too does the dominance of the parieto-occipital lobe. While Denny-Brown notes that he cannot refute this explanation, he sees it as more likely that the patient's lesion simply did not extend posteriorly to produce agnosia. Therefore, he argues that the difference between causes of amorphosynthesis and agnosia is directly related to the size and extension of the parieto-occipital lesion. As a whole, he concludes that amorphosynthesis of the opposite side of the body from a parieto-occipital lesion can occur on as a result of either left or right-sided lesion, even though amorphosynthesis from right parietal lesion is more commonly observed.

=== Fazlullah:Tactile Perception Rivalry And Tactile-Amorphosynthesis In The Localization Of Cerebral Lesions ===
At the time of Fazlullah's writing, neurologists were interested in the clinical value of using bilateral simultaneous and ipsilateral double stimuli in testing sensations of the skin. This testing is applied simultaneously on two sides of the body. In such studies, patients are required to announce whether or not they can feel any type of sensation on either side of their body. Such procedures are meant to study the sensory suppression phenomenon present in tactile-amorphosynthesis. In Fazlullah's study, patients with parietal lesions were blindfolded and tested for tactile-amorphosynthesis by applying simultaneous stimulation on both sides of the body. Patients were then asked to report on the size, shape and nature of the presented object. Results determined that patients with a right parietal lobe lesions presented symptoms such as anosognosia, hemiasomatognosia, metamorphognosia, corporeal agnosia, phantom sensations, transposition of parts of the body, constructional apraxia, disorientation of space, agnosia of the left portion of space, anaesthoagnosia, and Balint optic ataxia, while patients with left parietal lobe lesions presented symptoms such as Gerstmann syndrome, parietal apraxia and construction apraxia. Other patients with symptoms of Tactile-Amorphosynthesis showed signs of lobe lesions in the sensory tract and the spinal cord glioma. For this reason, such studies as Fazlullah's suggest that patients with lesions in other regions of the brain or spinal cord can also develop tactile-amorphosynthesis.

=== Cherington: Amorphosynthesis on the Chess Board ===
A 23-year-old college student who collapsed the day after a party due to the consumption of heroin showed signs of arterial branch disease in the interior, middle and left parietal veins through bilateral carotid angiography. Further testing, radio isotope scintigraphy, revealed the spread of a left parietal occipital tumor a week after. Once fully conscious, the patient showed signs of hemiparesis and deficit in right visual field. However, the patient was still able to speak with no sign of disturbance in language. By the 11th day, double simultaneous stimulation showed rare mistakes being made on the right side of his visual field as well as unawareness of the right side of his body. These symptoms caused a diagnosis of Amorphosynthesis.

Although the patient made rare mistakes on the right side of his visual field, he also showed improvement when playing chess by correctly using his pieces, making more passive moves and blunts on the right side on the chessboard. Double simultaneous testing revealed a fully intact right visual field as well as movement. Stereognosis determined that the patient was capable of localizing touch on his right hand.

In general, games can become useful when evaluating spatial perception problems such as those found in patients with amorphosynthesis. The improvements recorded from this patient are in relation with Denny-Brown and Welman's observations of patients with disordered visual spatial summations with dominant hemisphere lesions.

== History ==
- Oppenheim (1885, 1911) described the stimulation applied on individuals with hemiplegia on both sides of the body as “double stimulation”.
- Head and Holmes (1911) observed Tactile-Amorphosynthesis on individuals with cortical disorders.
- Bender (1945) observed Tactile-Amorphosynthesis in patients with parietal lobe lesions and termed it as “extinction”.
- Critchley (1949) after reviewing the phenomenon suggested a more explanatory term, “Tactile inattention”.
- Brain (1955) termed this suppression in sensory as “Perceptual rivalry”.
- Present day, there is no agreement of the nature and terminology of Tactile-Amorphosynthesis and further research is not currently being pursued.
