= Angular gyrus =

Gyrus of the parietal lobe of the brain

- Angular gyrus Supramarginal gyrus Broca's area Wernicke's area Primary auditory cortex

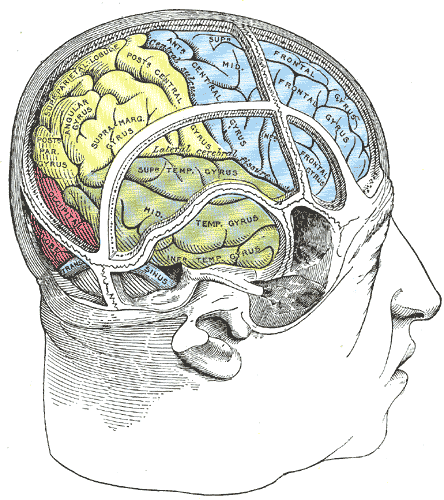
- Drawing of a cast to illustrate the relations of the brain to the skull. (Angular gyrus labeled at upper left, in yellow section.)

Details

Identifiers
- Latin: gyrus angularis
- NeuroNames: 109
- NeuroLex ID: birnlex_1376
- TA98: A14.1.09.124
- TA2: 5472
- FMA: 61898

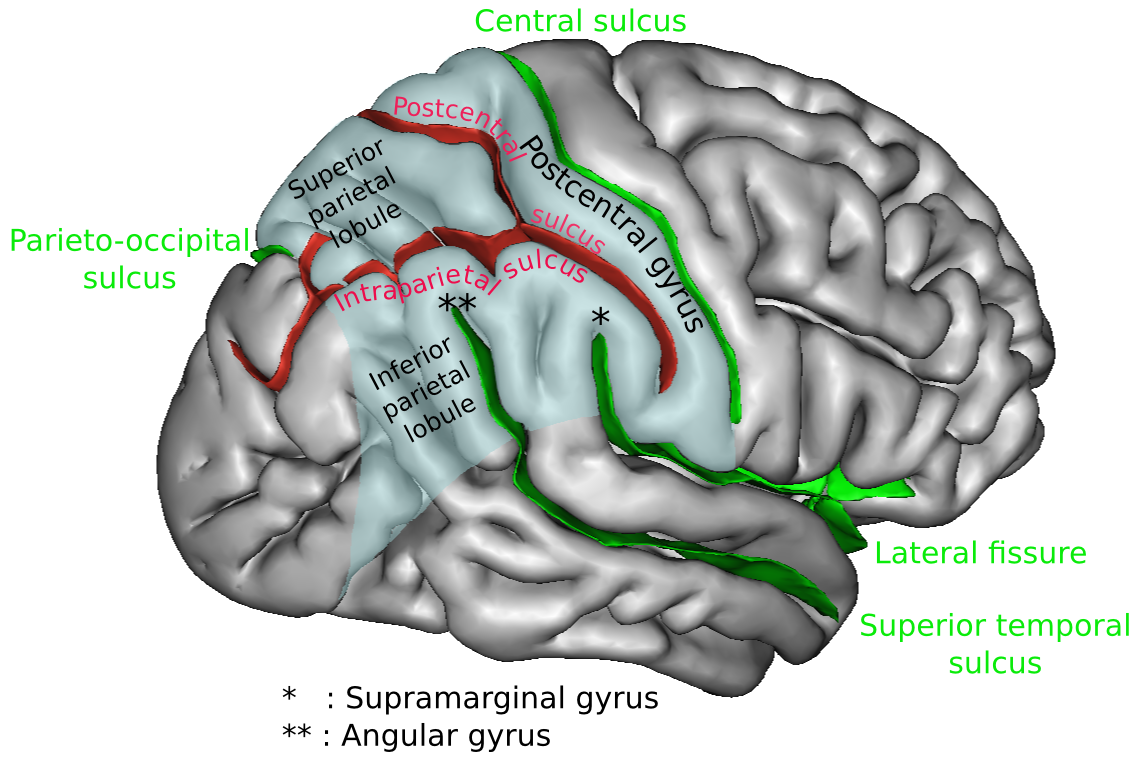
In this image, the angular gyrus is denoted by the double asterisk ** (right side of cerebrum)

The angular gyrus is a region of the brain lying mainly in the posteroinferior region of the parietal lobe, occupying the posterior part of the inferior parietal lobule. It represents the Brodmann area 39.

Its significance is in transferring visual information to Wernicke's area, in order to make meaning out of visually perceived words. It is also involved in a number of processes related to language, number processing and spatial cognition, memory retrieval, attention, and theory of mind.

== Anatomy ==
=== Connections ===
Left and right angular gyri are connected by the dorsal splenium and isthmus of the corpus callosum.

Connections To the Angular gyrus
Connected To The	Via the
ipsilateral frontal and caudallateral prefrontal and inferior frontal regions	superior longitudinal fasciculus.
caudate	inferior occipitofrontal fasciculus
parahippocampal gyrus and hippocampus	inferior longitudinal fasciculus
precuneus and superior frontal gyrus	occipitofrontal fasciculus,
supramarginal gyrus	local arcuate

=== Boundaries ===
- Anteriorly by the supramarginal gyrus.
- Superiorly by the intraparietal sulcus.
- Posteriorly by the parieto-occipital sulcus.
- Inferiorly the angular gyrus of the parietal lobe is continuous as the superior and middle temporal gyri. Also, the angular sulcus, which is capped by the angular gyrus, is continuous as the superior temporal sulcus inferiorly.

== Function ==
The angular gyrus is the part of the brain associated with complex language functions (i.e. reading, writing and interpretation of what is written). Lesion to this part of the brain shows symptoms of the Gerstmann syndrome: effects include finger agnosia, alexia (inability to read), acalculia (inability to use arithmetic operations), agraphia (inability to copy), and left-right confusion.

=== Language ===
Norman Geschwind proposed that written word is translated to internal monologue via the angular gyrus.

V. S. Ramachandran, and Edward Hubbard published a paper in 2003 in which they hypothesized the angular gyrus to play a role in understanding metaphors. They stated:

There may be neurological disorders that disturb metaphor and synaesthesia. This has not been studied in detail but we have seen disturbances in the Bouba/Kiki effect (Ramachandran & Hubbard, 2001a) as well as with proverbs in patients with angular gyrus lesions. It would be interesting to see whether they have deficits in other types of synaesthetic metaphor, e.g. 'sharp cheese' or 'loud shirt'. There are also hints that patients with right hemisphere lesions show problems with metaphor. It is possible that their deficits are mainly with spatial metaphors, such as 'He stepped down as director'.

The fact that the angular gyrus is proportionately much larger in hominids than other primates, and its strategic location at the crossroads of areas specialized for processing touch, hearing and vision, leads Ramachandran to believe that it is critical both to conceptual metaphors and to cross-modal abstractions more generally. However, recent research challenges this theory.

Research by Krish Sathian (Emory University) using functional magnetic resonance imaging (fMRI) suggests that the angular gyrus does not play a role in creating conceptual metaphors. Sathian theorizes that conceptual metaphors activate the texture-selective somatosensory cortex in the parietal operculum.

Brownsett and Wise highlight the role of the left angular gyrus in both speaking and writing.

=== Arithmetic and spatial cognition ===
Since 1919, brain injuries to the angular gyrus have been known to often cause arithmetic deficits. Functional imaging has shown that while other parts of the parietal lobe bilaterally are involved in approximate calculations due to its link with spatiovisual abilities, the left angular gyrus together with left Inferior frontal gyrus are involved in exact calculation due to verbal arithmetic fact retrieval. When activation in the left angular gyrus is greater, a person's arithmetic skills are also more competent.

=== Attention ===
The right angular gyrus has been associated with spatiovisual attention toward salient features. It may allocate attention by employing a bottom-up strategy which draws on the area's ability to attend to retrieved memories. For example, the angular gyrus plays a critical role in distinguishing left from right by integrating the conceptual understanding of the language term "left" or "right" with its location in space. Furthermore, the angular gyrus has been associated with orienting in three dimensional space, not because it interprets space, but because it may control attention shifts in space.

=== Other functions ===
==== Default mode network ====
The angular gyrus is part of the default mode network, a network of brain regions activated during multi-modal activities that are independent of external stimuli.

==== Awareness ====
The angular gyrus reacts differently to intended and consequential movement. This suggests that the angular gyrus monitors the self's intended movements and uses the added information to compute differently, as it does for consequential movements. By recording the discrepancy, the angular gyrus maintains an awareness of the self.

==== Memory retrieval ====
Activation of the angular gyrus shows that not only does it mediate memory retrieval, but it also notes contradictions between what is expected from the retrieval, and what is unusual. The angular gyrus can access both content and episodic memories and is useful in inferring from these the intentions of human characters. Furthermore, the angular gyrus may use a feedback strategy to ascertain whether a retrieval is expected or unusual.

==== Out-of-body experiences ====
Experiments have demonstrated the ability of stimulation of the right angular gyrus to induce out-of-body experiences. Stimulation of the left angular gyrus in one experiment caused a woman to perceive a shadowy person lurking behind her. The shadowy figure is actually a perceived double of the self. Another such experiment gave the test subject the sensation of being on the ceiling. This is attributed to a discrepancy in the actual position of the body, and the mind's perceived location of the body.

== Clinical significance ==
Damage to the angular gyrus manifests as Gerstmann syndrome. Damage may impair one or more of the below functions.

1. Dysgraphia/agraphia: deficiency in the ability to write
2. Dyscalculia/acalculia: difficulty in learning or comprehending mathematics
3. Finger agnosia: inability to distinguish the fingers on the hand
4. Left-right disorientation

== Additional images ==
Position of angular gyrus (shown in red).

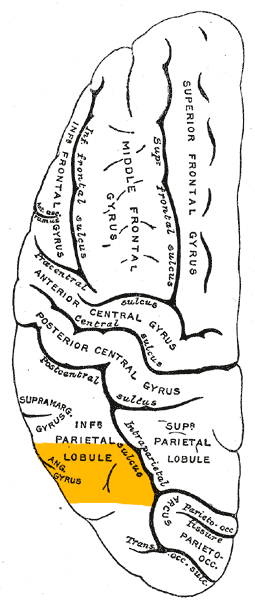
Lateral surface of left cerebral hemisphere, viewed from above. Angular gyrus is shown in orange.

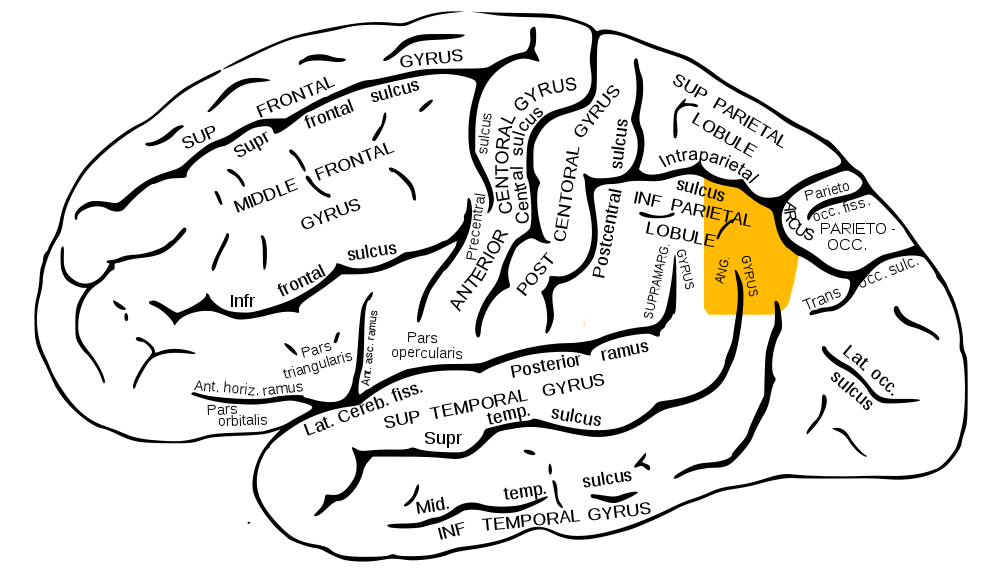
Lateral surface of left cerebral hemisphere, viewed from the side. Angular gyrus is shown in orange.

Lateral view of a human brain, main gyri labeled.

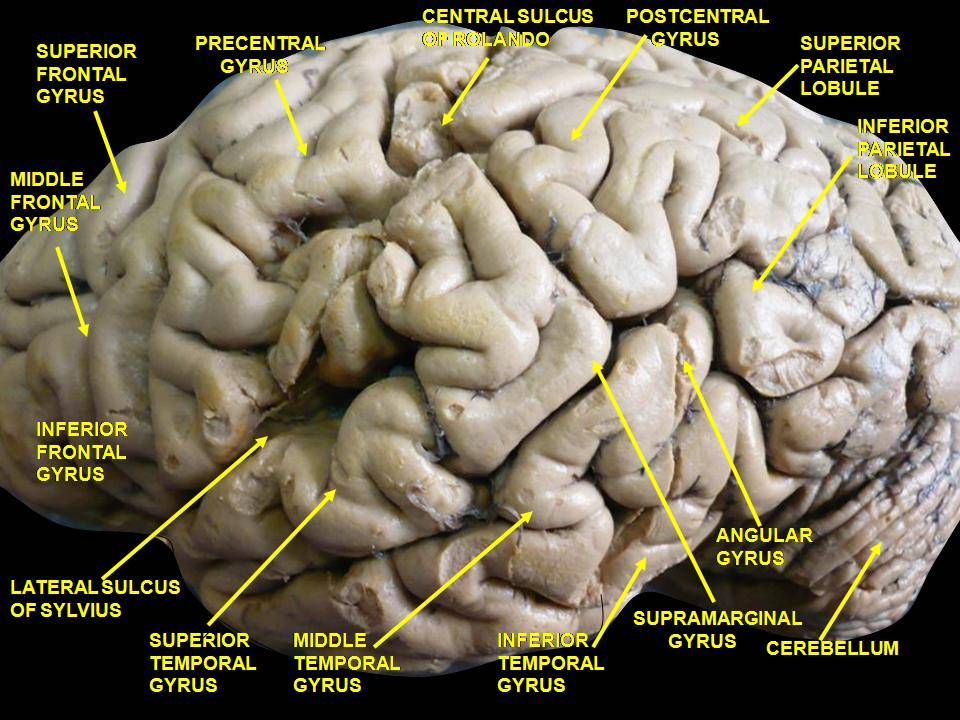
Cerebrum. Lateral view. Deep dissection.

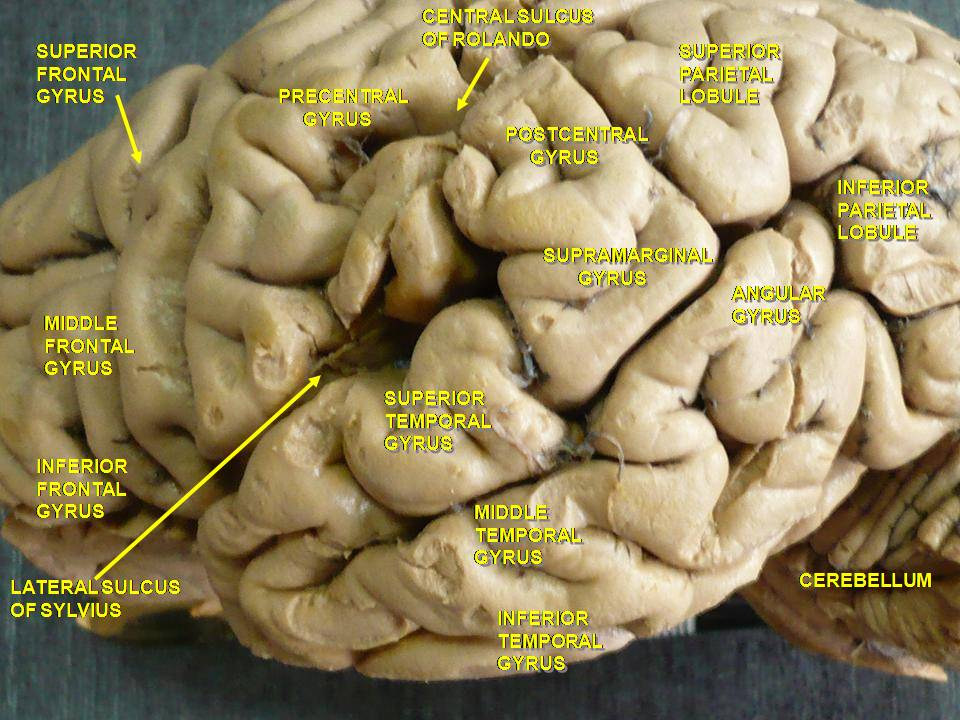
Cerebrum. Lateral view. Deep dissection.

Angular gyrus highlighted in green on coronal T1 MRI image

Angular gyrus highlighted in green on sagittal T1 MRI image

Angular gyrus highlighted in green on transversal T1 MRI image

== See also ==
- Temporoparietal junction
