= Acalculia =

Acquired difficulty with simple maths

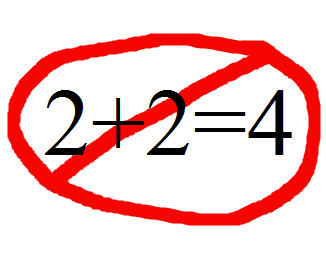
- Calculation impairments include the inability to perform simple mathematical operations, such as addition, subtraction, division, and multiplication
- Specialty: Psychiatry, Neurology

Acalculia is an acquired impairment in which people have difficulty performing simple mathematical tasks, such as adding, subtracting, multiplying, and even simply stating which of two numbers is larger. The condition has substantial negative impact on the wellbeing and independence of those affected. Acalculia is distinguished from dyscalculia in that acalculia is acquired late in life due to neurological injury such as a stroke, while dyscalculia is a specific developmental disorder first observed during the acquisition of mathematical knowledge. The name comes from the Greek a- meaning "not" and Latin calculare, which means "to count".

== Signs and symptoms ==
Calculation impairments include the inability to perform simple mathematical operations, such as addition, subtraction, division, and multiplication.

As calculation involves the integration of several cognitive skills, it is understood that an individual with acalculia (or calculation difficulties) is deficient in any of the following four realms:

1. understanding that every number represents a value and immediately registering this value,
2. recognizing a number's value with respect to other numbers,
3. knowing a number's location in series of numbers, and
4. association of a numerical symbol with its name, spoken verbally.

Young schoolchildren are presented with mathematical concepts in a cumulative manner. Advancement requires the grasping of fundamental concepts before progressing to more difficult and involved concepts. There is a natural variation in the speed with which young schoolchildren grasp mathematical concepts, and those that have extreme difficulty retaining the foundations of mathematical concepts (such as global quantification or numerosity perception) are considered to have developmental dyscalculia.

=== Variations ===
Acalculia is associated with lesions of the parietal lobe (especially the angular gyrus) and the frontal lobe and can be an early sign of dementia. Acalculia is sometimes observed as a "pure" deficit, but is commonly observed as one of a constellation of symptoms, including agraphia, finger agnosia and right-left confusion, after damage to the left angular gyrus, known as Gerstmann syndrome.

Studies of patients with lesions to the parietal lobe have demonstrated that lesions to the angular gyrus tend to lead to greater impairments in memorized mathematical facts, such as multiplication tables, with relatively unimpaired subtraction abilities. Conversely, patients with lesions in the region of the intraparietal sulcus tend to have greater deficits in subtraction, with preserved multiplication abilities. These double dissociations lend support to the idea that different regions of the parietal cortex are involved in different aspects of numerical processing.

== Cause ==
Damage to the left angular gyrus is known to cause computational difficulties like those associated with primary acalculia and anarithmetia. However, damage to various but not necessarily identified areas of the brain can cause computational difficulties, as various cognitive functions are necessary to execute mathematical calculations.

== Diagnosis ==
Because acalculia is a symptom of the more commonly known Gerstmann syndrome, it may be difficult to solely diagnose acalculia. Instead, it may be labeled as one of its symptoms, and lead to the eventual diagnosis of Gerstmann syndrome. "Provided that general mental impairment and significant aphasic disorder can be excluded as primary factors, the presentation of deficits such as agraphia, acalculia, and right-left confusion should alert the clinician to the possibility of focal posterior parietal lobe disease." Structural and functional neuroimaging may be of further value in determining the existence of underlying neurologic abnormalities.

== Screening ==
Common screening procedures for acalculia include asking the patient to answer questions about order, conducting memory tests to rule out the possibility of a mental disorder, confrontation naming (naming parts of objects), reading tests, writing tests, calculation tests, finger naming, clock drawing, and left/right orientation testing. The writing tests, spelling tests, finger naming, and left/right orientation are all tests to confirm the presence of Gerstmann syndrome. Acalculia is one out of four defining components of Gerstmann syndrome; the other three components are agraphia, finger agnosia, and right–left confusion. Typically, acalculia is present because of Gerstmann syndrome or it is linked with other disorders. It is imperative to note that there is "difficulty separating calculation disorders from disruptions in other domains". This is why testing functions besides calculation abilities is crucial for the screening of acalculia – so that other disorders can be ruled out. More extensive testing includes "brain mapping techniques such as position emission tomography (PET), functional magnetic resonance imaging (fMRI), and event related potentials (ERP), which have helped to illuminate some of the functional anatomical relationships for number processing".

A basic examination of numerical abilities in brain-damaged patients should include both verbal and non-verbal aspects of number processing. The following tests are suggested:

- Forward and backward digit span.
- Forward and backward counting.
- Symbolic transcoding (reading aloud and taking dictation of simple and multidigit numerals).
- Single-digit arithmetic. To reduce the contribution of input and output deficits to the patient's performance, problems may be simultaneously presented in written form and read aloud by the examiner. Familiar multiplication problems and simple subtractions should be tested in priority, as they reflect rote verbal and quantity-based processes, respectively.
- Multidigit written calculations.
- Concrete arithmetic problems requiring some planning.
- Evaluation of the numerosity of sets of dots, presented either briefly to test estimation abilities, or for an unlimited duration to allow for serial counting.

== Treatment ==
Gerstmann syndrome and similar symptom combinations are outcomes, not diseases. Treatment, therefore, is dedicated to the underlying neurological abnormality. Cognitive rehabilitation may be useful for the symptoms that interfere with activities of daily life, such as agraphia and acalculia. However, there are currently no clinically tested interventions for the condition, and a systematic review had identified only 16 published interventions, with a total of 31 patients.

There are several ways in which rehabilitation of acalculia is carried out. Tsvetkova proposes using the "number reconstruction" method. It is started by incorporating certain "visual elements (e.g., completing eight, starting from the number 3), looking for certain elements within a number (e.g., looking for the number 1 in the number 4), and finally, performing a verbal analysis of the similarities and differences that can be observed between numbers". At the same time that these number reconstruction technique is used, spatial orientation exercises, comprehension of the right-to-left relationship, and visual analysis of geometrical objects and forms should be developed.

In a more basic form, the method used was rote practice: the retrieval of simple arithmetical facts through drill or through conceptual training or the creation of strategies for solving concrete problems.

Sohlberg and Mateer have said that "treatment should then include exercises that permit spatial analysis and visual motor ability training." Rehabilitation tasks are implemented following a program that progressively increases difficulty, beginning with simple movements designed for reaching for or indicating objects following by copying figures in two dimensions, and concluding with the construction of three-dimensional figures.

In a case study, Rosselli and Ardila describe the rehabilitation of a 58-year-old woman with spatial alexia, agraphia, and acalculia associated to a vascular injury in the right hemisphere. The patient could adequately perform oral calculations but was completely incapable of performing written arithmetical operations with numbers composed of two or more digits. In a special test of written arithmetical operations (addition, subtraction, multiplication, and division), and initial score of 0/20 was obtained. She was observed to have mixed up the arithmetical procedures and inadequately oriented the columns in mathematical problems. The rehabilitation techniques implemented included the following:

1. "Using short paragraphs with a red vertical line placed on the left margin and with the lines numbered on the left and right sides, the patient, using her index finger, had to look for the numbers corresponding to each line. The clues (vertical line and numbers) were progressively eliminated.
2. In a text with no more than 12 lines, the patient had to complete the missing letters (i.e., perform sequential and ordered spatial exploration).
3. Letter cancellation exercises were repeated constantly, and clues to facilitate their execution were included. Time and precision were recorded.
4. In spontaneous writing exercises using lined paper with a thick colored line in the left margin, the patient had to look for the vertical line when finishing each line. Later, the line was eliminated, but the patient had to verbalize (initially aloud and later to herself) and explore to the extreme left before beginning to read the next line.
5. To facilitate the relearning of numbers through dictation, squares were used to place the numbers in space, and the concepts of hierarchy were practiced permanently (units, tens, hundreds, etc.).
6. To provide training in arithmetical operations, she was given in writing additions, subtractions, multiplications, and divisions with digits separated in columns by thick colored lines and the tops of the columns were numbered (from right to left). The patient had to verbalize the arithmetical procedures and, with her right index finger, look for the left margin before she could pass to the next column. Later, the patient herself would write the operations she was dictated. The techniques described previously were proven useful 8 months after the treatment was started. The patient presented significant improvement but in no way a complete recovery."

Individuals with acalculia generally live normal lives, unless there are other disabilities or traumatic injuries present that prevent normal living. Details from a case study published in 2003 described the condition of a 55-year-old woman living with acalculia. "In addition to writing and calculation deficits, both spelling and reading had declined. Lapses of memory occurred occasionally. Despite these deficits, daily living activities remained intact". Another case study published in 1990 described the condition and management of a former female accountant who had "suffered a small circumscribed left parietal subdural hematoma in an auto accident." She was able to speak, read, and write normally, but she was unable to perform simple addition past the number ten. The case study reports that the patient also demonstrated "severe finger agnosia, and in fact the finger agnosia appeared to be directly related to her inability to perform calculations." The patient was somewhat able to manage her acalculia by visiting a therapist who worked with her specifically on finger recognition tasks, especially on finger calculations. This therapy raised her mathematical ability to a high school level after she received treatment for a number of months.

== Epidemiology ==
"Gerstmann syndrome and similar posterior parietal symptom combinations (like acalculia) are usually the result of focal cerebrovascular disease in a posterior branch of the left middle cerebral artery or a broader zone infarct, usually involving the angular gyrus or subjacent white matter (Brodmann area 39). In rare cases, traumatic brain injury of an expanding neoplasm in this same region can cause all or elements (acalculia is one of four elements) of the symptoms of this syndrome".

== History ==
The term acalculia was coined by Salomon Eberhard Henschen in 1925; it refers to the decrease in cognitive capacity for calculation that results from damage to the brain. Earlier, in 1908, researchers Max Lewandowsky and Stadelmann published the first report of an individual with calculation impairment due to brain damage. The individual had trouble performing calculations on paper and mentally. Further, he had difficulty recognizing arithmetic symbols. The report was key in that it established calculation disorders as separate from language disorders, as the two were formerly associated.

Henschen's research was consistent with Lewandowsky's and Stadelmann's finding. From his research, he was also able to propose that certain areas of the brain played particular roles involved in the understanding and execution of calculation. These areas include the third frontal convolution (pronunciation of numbers), the angular gyrus and the fissure interparietalis (reading of numbers), and the angular gyrus again for the writing of numbers.

Shortly after Henshen's advances, Berger in 1926 distinguished between primary and secondary acalculia. Primary acalculia is a "pure" condition in which an individual can neither comprehend mathematical concepts nor perform mathematical operations. Secondary acalculia is a loss of calculation abilities that stems from other cognitive difficulties, such as memory. It has been questioned whether primary acalculia can exist independently of other cognitive impairments.

In 1936, Lindquist proposed that lesions of different areas of the brain can cause different calculation defects, and that there are therefore several variations of acalculia.

In 1940, Gerstmann claimed that acalculia is associated with aspects of Gerstmann syndrome, which include right-left confusion, agraphia, and digital agnosia.

In 1983, Boller and Grafman further concluded that calculation difficulties can also arise from various shortcomings, such as the inability to assign value to the name of a number.

Little research has been done on acalculia, despite the fact the calculation is considered an essential, upper-level cognitive skill. However, calculation skills are assessed in some neuropsychological exams such as the mini-mental state examination (MMSE). There exist no norms for acalculia against which a person can be compared to assess his/her level of cognitive impairment with regards to calculation abilities.

== See also ==
- Hypercalculia
- Numerical cognition
