= Finger agnosia =

Loss of ability to recognize fingers

Finger agnosia, first defined in 1924 by Josef Gerstmann, is the loss in the ability to distinguish, name, or recognize the fingers—not only the patient's own fingers, but also the fingers of others, and drawings and other representations of fingers. It is one of a tetrad of symptoms in Gerstmann syndrome, although it is also possible for finger agnosia to exist on its own without any other disorders. Usually, lesions to the left angular gyrus and posterior parietal areas can lead to finger agnosia.

== Causes ==
Lesions to the left angular gyrus are associated with finger agnosia, as well as the other symptoms of Gerstmann Syndrome, also known as Angular Gyrus Syndrome. In a study by Rusconi et al., repetitive transcranial magnetic stimulation was used in healthy individuals to simulate finger agnosia. Stimulation to the intraparietal sulcus, supramarginal gyrus, as well as the left and right angular gyrus and posterior parietal areas caused difficulties in naming, recognizing, and distinguishing fingers.

== Attributes ==
Patients with finger agnosia may have difficulty selectively moving fingers, regardless if it is by command or imitation. Others show an inability to name or point to others' fingers, or to show the same finger on the opposite hand. Persons with finger agnosia are able to name and point to a finger when able to use visual guidance, but will have more errors than a person without the disorder. When their own hand is out of sight and they are asked to name a finger that was touched, they are unable to do so and perform at chance.

== Without Gerstmann syndrome ==
Although it is a necessary component of Gerstmann's syndrome, cases of finger agnosia alone have been reported. Della Sala et al. reported a woman with a stroke in the left subcortical posterior parietal area who had only finger agnosia a year and a half later.

== Acalculia ==
There is a strong link between acalculia and finger agnosia. Early in development, calculation begins with observation of fingers. The order that is used when counting with fingers is very specific and it is found in a variety of different cultures. The use of a base ten number system is also found in many cultures. Gerstmann believed that it was no coincidence the word digit means both a finger and any numeral. Rusconi et al. suggested that these two conditions co-occur because they are close in cortical territory. In their 2005 study with repetitive transcranial magnetic stimulation (rTMS), they noted both finger agnosia and acalculia in the test subjects when areas of the intraparietal sulcus were stimulated. They concluded that the areas underlying finger agnosia and acalculia are extremely close to one another, but distinct. These areas receive blood from the same branch of the middle cerebral artery. Any damage to that blood supply would cause symptoms of both acalculia and finger agnosia.

== Treatment and prognosis ==
As in many other agnosias, those with the disorder have difficulty recognizing their errors and often do not correct themselves. There is no known treatment for finger agnosia. Typically, finger agnosia does not present difficulties in daily life. In most cases, visual guidance can help with any difficulty in distinguishing or moving the appropriate finger.
