= Hugo Liepmann =

German neurologist and psychiatrist (1863–1925)

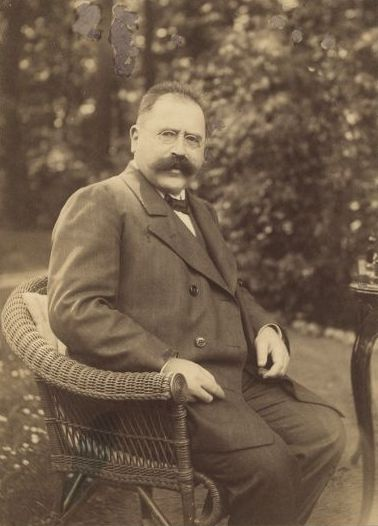
Hugo Liepmann

Hugo Karl Liepmann (April 9, 1863 – May 6, 1925) was a German neurologist and psychiatrist born in Berlin, into a Jewish family.

Initially, he studied both chemistry and philosophy at the Universities of Freiburg and Leipzig, obtaining his doctorate in 1885. His interests later turned to medicine, and after completion of studies, worked as an assistant to Carl Wernicke in the psychiatric clinic at Breslau. In 1906 he became head physician at Dalldorf (Berlin-Wittenau), followed by an assignment as director of the Städtische Irrenanstalt zu Lichtenberg (Herzberge) in 1914.

Liepmann is remembered for his pioneer work involving cerebral localization of function. From anatomical studies, he postulated that planned or commanded actions were controlled in the parietal lobe of the brain's dominant hemisphere, and not in the frontal lobe. He conducted extensive research of a disorder he called apraxia, a term that he introduced in 1900. Apraxia is described as the inability to execute planned coordinated and complex movements, without muscle or sensory impairment. Liepmann believed that damage in the parietal lobe prevented activation of learned sequences of actions that are necessary to produce desired results on command. As a result of his studies, he divided apraxia into three types:

- ideational: object blindness, where the patient is incapable of making appropriate use of familiar objects upon command.
- ideomotor: the inability to follow verbal commands or mimic an action, such as saluting or waving goodbye.
- kinetic: clumsiness in performing a precision act that is not due to paralysis, muscle weakness, or sensory loss.

== Published works ==
- Das Krankheitsbild der Apraxie ("motorischen Asymbolie") : auf Grund eines Falles von einseitiger Apraxie, 1900 – The pathology of apraxia ("motor asymbolia") pursuant to a case of unilateral apraxia.
- Über Ideenflucht. Begriffsbestimmung und psychologische Analyse, 1904 – On flight of ideas : Definition and psychological analysis.
- Ueber Störungen des Handelns bei Gehirnkranken, 1905 – On disorders of action involving brain health.
- Drei Aufsätze aus dem Apraxiegebiet : neu Durchgesehen und mit Zusätzen versehen, 1908 – Three essays on the apraxia region.
- "Translations from Liepmann's essays on apraxia", 1980.
