= Inferior parietal lobule =

Portion of the parietal lobe of the brain

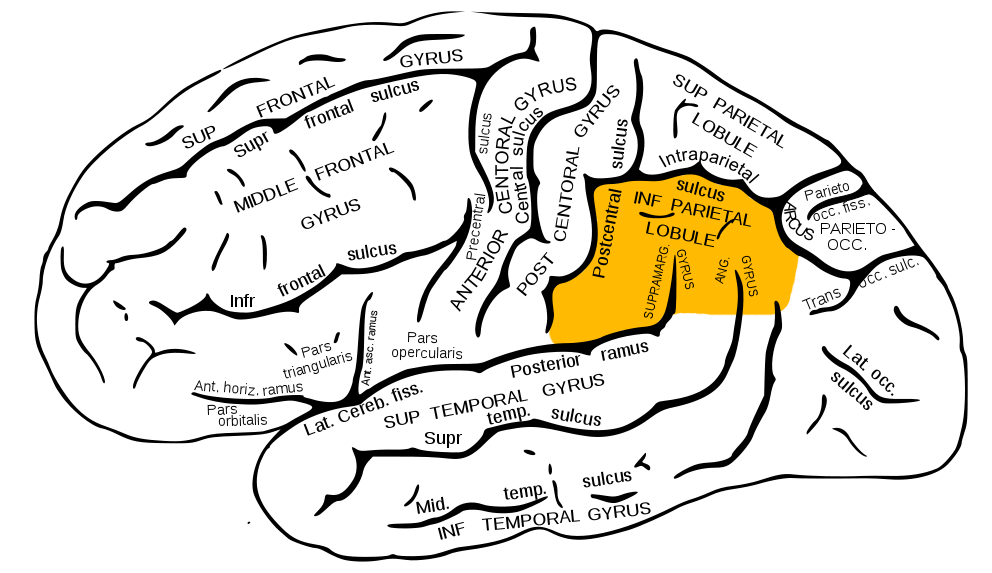
- Lateral surface of left cerebral hemisphere, viewed from the side. (Inferior parietal lobule is shown in orange.)

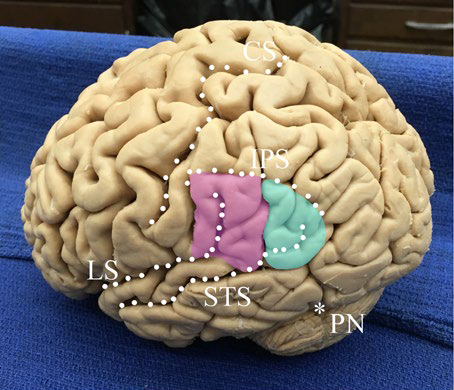
- Superficial anatomy of the inferior parietal lobule. Purple: Supramarginal gyrus Blue: Angular gyrus LS: Lateral sulcus (Sylvian fissure), CS: Central sulcus, IPS: Intraparietal sulcus, STS:Superior temporal sulcus, PN: Preoccipital notch.

Details
- Part of: Parietal lobe

Identifiers
- Latin: Lobulus parietalis inferior
- NeuroNames: 107
- NeuroLex ID: birnlex_1194
- TA98: A14.1.09.125
- TA2: 5471
- FMA: 77536

The inferior parietal lobule (subparietal district) lies below the horizontal portion of the intraparietal sulcus, and behind the lower part of the postcentral sulcus. Also known as Geschwind's territory after Norman Geschwind, an American neurologist, who in the early 1960s recognised its importance. It is a part of the parietal lobe.

== Structure ==
It is divided from rostral to caudal into two gyri:

- The supramarginal gyrus (BA 40), arches over the upturned end of the lateral fissure; it is continuous in front with the postcentral gyrus, and behind with the superior temporal gyrus.
- The angular gyrus (BA 39), arches over the posterior end of the superior temporal sulcus, behind which it is continuous with the middle temporal gyrus.

In males, the inferior parietal lobule is significantly less voluminous in the right hemisphere compared to the left. This extreme asymmetry is not present in females and this may contribute to cognitive differences between the sexes.

In macaque neuroanatomy, this region is often divided into caudal and rostral portions, cIPL and rIPL, respectively. The cIPL is further divided into areas Opt and PG whereas rIPL is divided into PFG and PF areas.

== Function ==
Inferior parietal lobule has been involved in the perception of emotions in facial stimuli, and interpretation of sensory information. The Inferior parietal lobule is concerned with language, mathematical operations, and body image, particularly the supramarginal gyrus and the angular gyrus.

== Clinical significance ==
Destruction to the inferior parietal lobule of the dominant hemisphere results in Gerstmann's syndrome: left–right confusion, finger agnosia, dysgraphia and dyslexia, dyscalculia, contralateral hemianopia, or lower quadrantanopia. Destruction to the inferior parietal lobule of the non-dominant hemisphere results in topographic memory loss, anosognosia, constructional apraxia, dressing apraxia, contralateral hemispatial neglect, contralateral hemianopia, or lower quadrantanopia.

== In other animals ==
Functional imaging experiments suggest that the left anterior supramarginal gyrus (aSMG) of the human inferior parietal lobule exhibits an evolved specialization related to tool use. It is not currently known if this functional specialization is unique to humans as complementary experiments have only been performed with macaque monkeys and not apes. The habitual use of tools by chimpanzees makes the uniqueness of the human aSMG an open question as its function may have evolved prior to the split from our last common ancestor.

== Additional images ==
Animation. Inferior parietal lobule is shown in red.

Lateral view of a human brain, main gyri labeled.

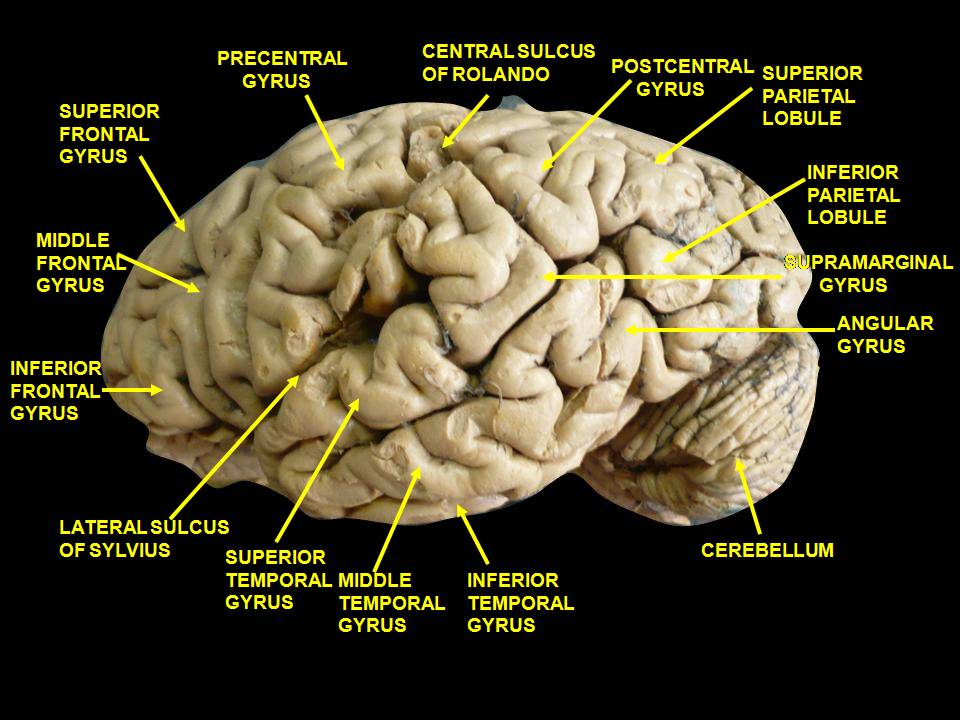
Cerebrum. Lateral view. Deep dissection.

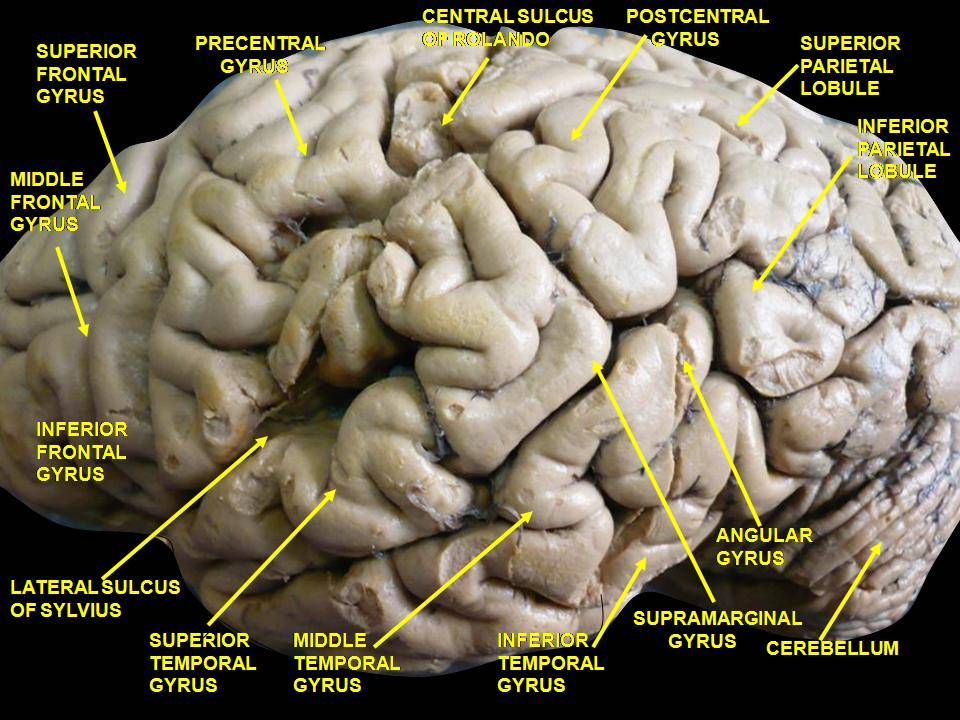
Cerebrum. Lateral view. Deep dissection.

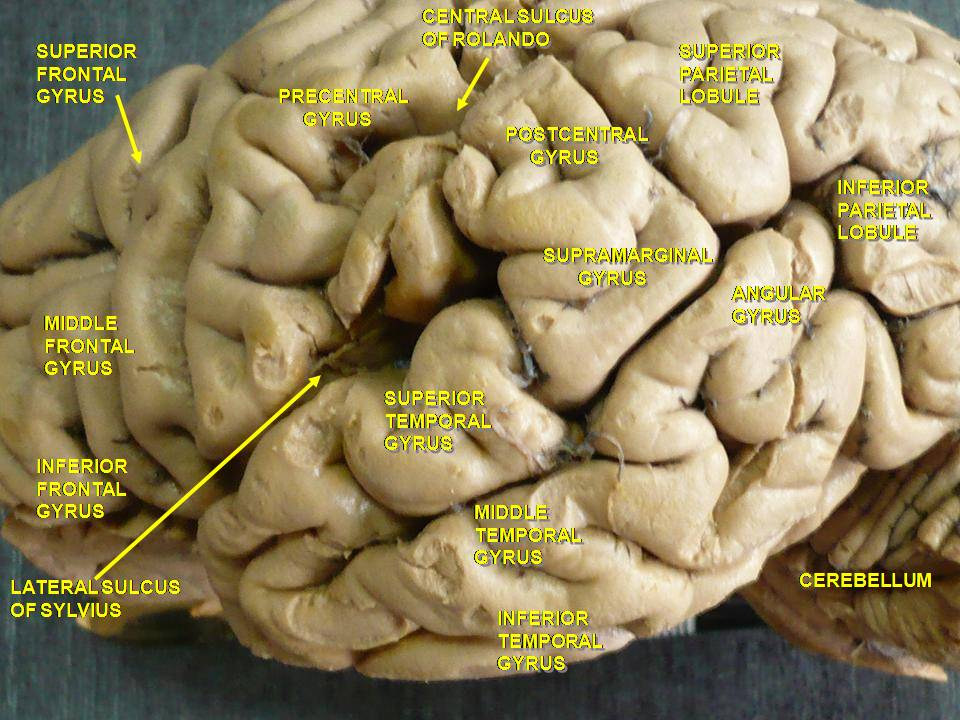
Cerebrum. Lateral view. Deep dissection.

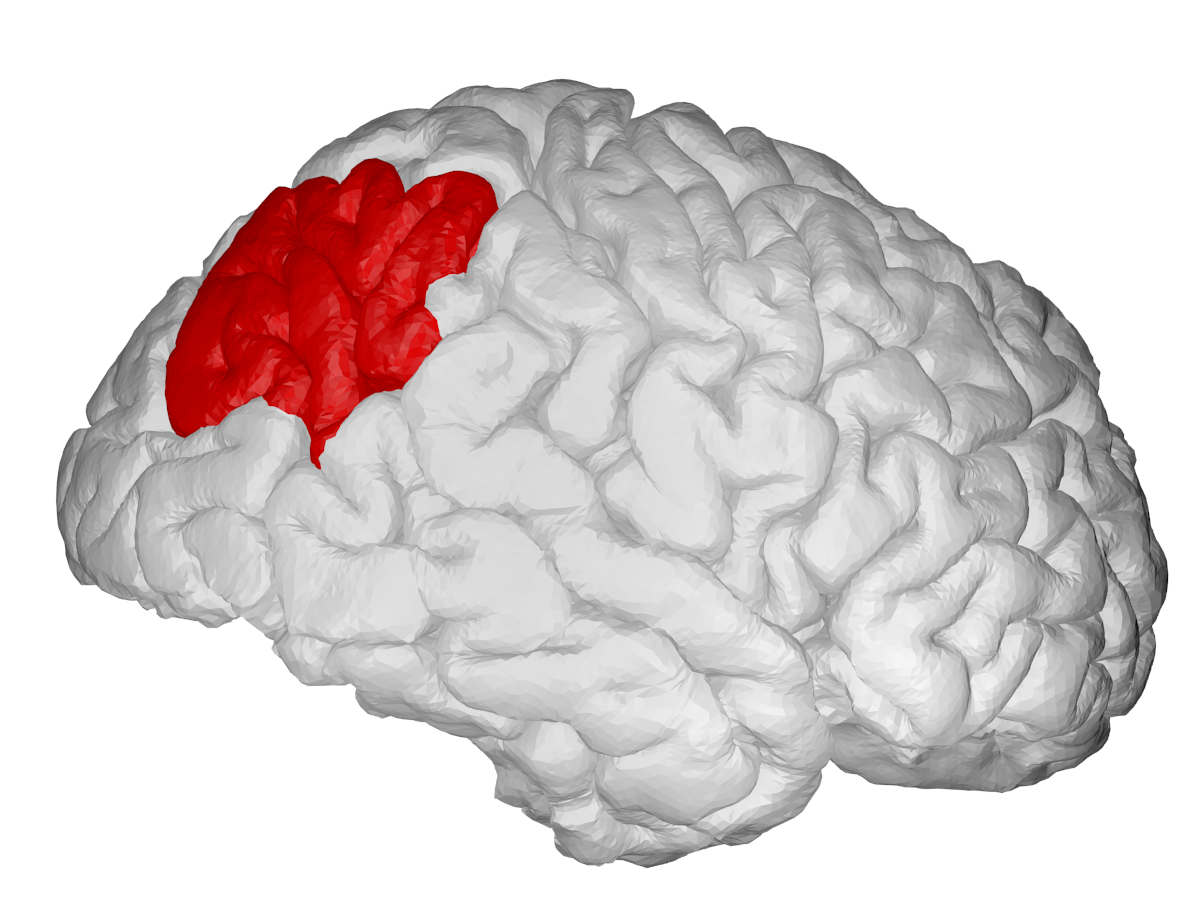
Inferior parietal lobule, right hemisphere view.

Inferior parietal lobule highlighted in green on coronal T1 MRI images

Inferior parietal lobule highlighted in green on sagittal T1 MRI images

Inferior parietal lobule highlighted in green on transversal T1 MRI images

== See also ==
- Temporoparietal junction
