= Extinction (neurology) =

Neurological disorder

Extinction is a neurological disorder that impairs the ability to simultaneously perceive multiple stimuli of the same type. Extinction is usually caused by damage resulting in lesions on the posterior parietal cortex (PPC) and more specifically, due to the damage to the decision-making circuits within the PPC.

== Effect of the laterality of the sensory inputs ==
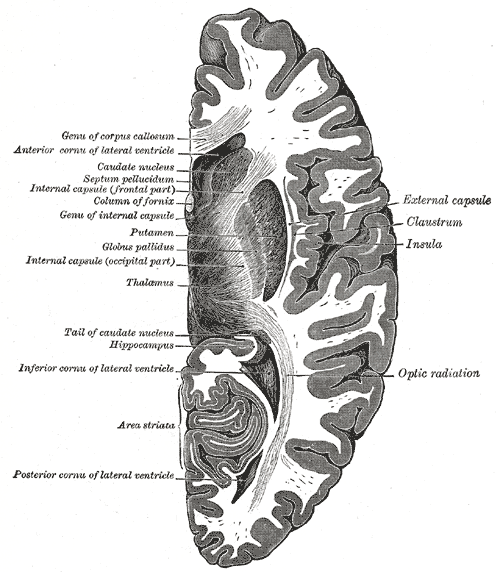
"Right hemisphere of the brain"

== Research and characteristics of extinction ==
In addition to revealing the critical lesion sites associated with the various clinical manifestations of visual neglect, a key message of the current investigation is that there is a need to develop more sensitive and nuanced assessment tools to characterize the different facets of this heterogeneous syndrome. It will be important to bring laboratory tests into the clinic in an effort to identify specific cognitive functions by examining each in isolation thus combining more specific descriptions extinction with better clinical measures that isolate specific cognitive functions to yield more consistent lesion mapping results in the future.

== Types ==
=== Visual extinction ===
Visual or spatial extinction, also known as pseudohemianopia, is the inability to perceive two simultaneous stimuli in each visual field. In visual extinction this attentional deficit in perception applies mainly to attention in the relevant dimension. Visual extinction is greatest when objects either have the same color or the same shape.

Studies suggest that brain damage to the parietal lobe causes sensory neglect and that in turn causes extinction. Any kind of brain damage, such as stroke, brain tissue death, or tumors, can lead to neglect and cause unilateral damage to one side of the parietal lobe. Overall, a person with parietal brain damage still has intact visual fields.

One way to reduce the effects of extinction is to use grouping of items. Brightness- and edge- based grouping both reduce visual extinction, and the effect is additive. Grouping with similar shapes also reduces the effects of extinction. This suggests that the attentional deficit in extinction can be compensated, at least in part, by the brain's object recognition systems.

While the parietal lobe deals with sensation and perception, the amygdala controls the perception of fear and emotion. This is because the ability of the amygdala to perceive fear is autonomous (without conscious effort and attention). However, perception of fear can become habituated, so efforts to reduce extinction by use of the amygdala can be unreliable.

=== Auditory extinction ===
Auditory extinction is the failure to hear simultaneous stimuli on the left and right sides. This extinction is also caused by brain damage on one side of the brain where awareness is lost on the contralesional side. Affected people report the presence of side-specific phonemes, albeit extinguishing them at the same time. This indicates that auditory extinction, like other forms of extinction, is more about acknowledging a stimulus in the contralesional side than it is about the actual sensing of the stimulus.

When it comes to treating and recognizing the occurrence of auditory extinction, most sound can still be perceived with the other ear. By nature, sound possesses directionality but still fills space, and these qualities make it more amenable to misattribution of source location. This is called the 'prior entry' effect: when a stimulus occurring at an attended location receives privileged access to awareness relative to one occurring at an unattended location.
