= Temporoparietal junction =

Area of the brain where the temporal and parietal lobes meet

- Side view of the human brain. TPJ is indicated by red circle.

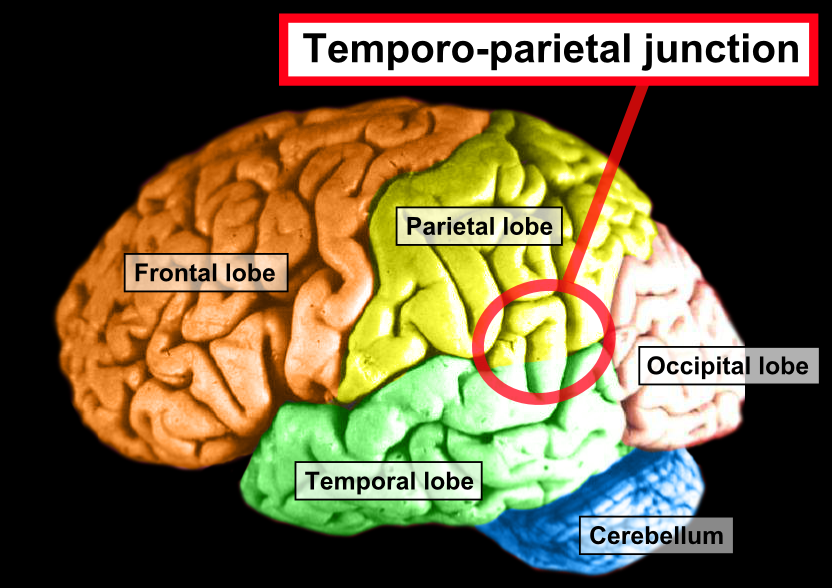
- Side view of the human brain. TPJ is indicated by red circle.

Identifiers
- Acronym: TPJ
- NeuroLex ID: nlx_144255

The temporoparietal junction (TPJ) is an area of the brain where the temporal and parietal lobes meet, at the posterior end of the lateral sulcus (Sylvian fissure). The TPJ incorporates information from the thalamus and the limbic system as well as from the visual, auditory, and somatosensory systems. The TPJ also integrates information from both the external environment as well as from within the body. The TPJ is responsible for collecting all of this information and then processing it.

This area is also known to play a crucial role in social cognition, including perspective-taking, empathy, self–other distinctions processes and theory of mind (ToM). The TPJ is also involved in attentional reorientation, enabling individuals to shift attention toward relevant environmental stimuli. Furthermore, damage to the TPJ has been implicated in having adverse effects on an individual's ability to make moral decisions and has been known to produce out-of-body experiences (OBEs). Electromagnetic stimulation of the TPJ can also cause these effects. Apart from these diverse roles that the TPJ plays, it is also known for its involvement in a variety of widespread disorders including anxiety disorders, amnesia, Alzheimer's disease, autism spectrum disorder, and schizophrenia.

== Anatomy and function ==
Animation. Both left and right temporoparietal junctions are shown in red.

The brain contains four main lobes: temporal lobe, parietal lobe, frontal lobe, and the occipital lobe. The temporoparietal junction lies in the region between the temporal and parietal lobes, near the lateral sulcus (Sylvian fissure). Specifically, it is composed of the inferior parietal lobule and the caudal parts of the superior temporal sulcus. There are two halves to the temporoparietal junction, with each component in their respective hemispheres of the brain. Each half of the TPJ pertains to various aspects of cognitive function. Often, however, the separate halves of the TPJ will work in coordination. The TPJ is mainly involved in information processing and perception.

=== Right temporoparietal junction ===
The right temporoparietal junction (rTPJ) is involved in the processing of information in terms of the ability of an individual to orient attention to new stimuli. Evidence from neuroimaging studies as well as lesion studies revealed that the rTPJ plays a pivotal role in analyzing signals from self-produced actions as well as with signals from the external environment. For example, an individual with lesions in their rTPJ would more than likely exhibit a sense of hemi-neglect, wherein they would no longer be able to pay attention to anything they observe on the left. So, if someone were to have a lesion in their rTPJ, then over time the awareness of the left limbs may fade without treatment. Visual signals provide the sensory information necessary for the brain to process spatial recognition of the world. When vision is limited, knowledge of existence begins to fade away since as far as the brain is concerned the object does not exist. Furthermore, the rTPJ plays a role in the way individuals observe and process information, thus impacting social interaction. Empathy and sympathy require an individual to simultaneously distinguish between different possible perspectives on the same situation. Imaging studies show that this ability depends upon the coordinated interaction of the rTPJ to identify and process the social cues presented to it. This rapid process allows for an individual to quickly react to situations.

=== Left temporoparietal junction ===
The left temporoparietal junction (lTPJ) contains both Wernicke's area and the angular gyrus, both prominent anatomical structures of the brain that are involved in language cognition, processing, and comprehension of both written and spoken language. Steven Pinker discusses this brain region, theorising that it underlies an amodal 'language of thought' or Mentalese. The lTPJ, in this account, takes in observations from external environments, such as conversations, makes connections in the brain regarding memories or incidents and then converts those thoughts and connections to written and spoken language. Pinker's full account of this is explained in The Language Instinct: How the Mind Creates Language. The lTPJ also plays an important role in reasoning of other's beliefs, intentions, and desires. Activation of the lTPJ was observed in patients processing mental states such as beliefs when an fMRI was used on patients as they were asked to make inferences regarding the mental states of others such as lying. This study was further supplemented by a study which identified that lesions to the left TPJ can impair cognitive processes specifically involved in the inference of someone else's belief, intention, or desire. Individuals with lesions in the lTPJ were no longer able to correctly identify when someone was lying or insinuating a false sense of belief or desire. The lTPJ is also involved in the processing of associating and remembering the names of individuals and objects.

== Disorders ==
The dopaminergic-serotonergic system mediates our ability to distinguish and understand others' beliefs as well as predict their behavior in light of that understanding. In certain disorders involving the dopaminergic-serotonergic system, this mentalizing process is disrupted and part or all of the process is impaired; this includes amnesia, Alzheimer's disease, and schizophrenia.

=== Amnesia ===
Amnesia is a deficit in memory caused by brain damage, disease, or physiological trauma. Amnesia is best understood via Henry Molaison, or patient H.M., who suffered from severe epilepsy and eventually had a temporal lobectomy. After surgery, his epilepsy improved but then he had anterograde amnesia, wherein long-term memory formation is inhibited. Short-term memory remained normal except that he could never remember anything that had happened after his surgery for very long. Based on general known roles of the TPJ, it is known that the TPJ is involved in the memory processing system of the body. Studies have also revealed that certain types of epileptic amnesia could be attributed to TPJ. fMRI studies indicated that there was lower activation of the rTPJ in patients with epileptic amnesia. Furthermore, it was noticed the autobiographical memories were affected in these patients. As such, the rTPJ along with the right cerebellum were identified as core components of autobiographical memory.

In terms of treatment, most forms of amnesia fix themselves without actually undergoing treatment. However, options such as cognitive therapy or occupational therapy have proved to help. Therapy will focus on various methods to improve a patient's memory and with repetition over time, a patient's memory as a whole will improve and eventually become close to normal.

=== Alzheimer's disease ===
Alzheimer's disease is the most common form of dementia and is also the sixth leading cause of death in the United States. This disease has no known cure and is a disease that worsens as it progresses and eventually leads to death. Reduced metabolism in the TPJ, along with the superior frontal sulcus, correlates with Alzheimer's patients' inability to perceive themselves as others do (with a third-person point of view); the discrepancy between a patient's understanding of their own cognitive impairment and the actual extent of their cognitive impairment increases as metabolism in the TPJ decreases. Additionally, the TPJ contains the praxicon, a dictionary of representations of different human actions, which is necessary to distinguishing between actions of the self and other people. Because dementia (including Alzheimer's) patients with anosognosia are unable to distinguish between the normal actions of other people and their own diminished abilities, it is expected that damage to the TPJ is arresting this cognitive function.

=== Autism spectrum disorder ===
There may be a connection between the temporoparietal junction and how individuals with autism spectrum disorder's recognition of socially awkward situations may differ from those not autistic. Research reported in 2015 from an experiment in which participants, high-functioning adults with autism spectrum disorder (ASD) and non autistic controls, were asked to watch socially awkward situations (a complete episode of the sitcom The Office) under an fMRI, which measured their brain activity. Several brain regions implicated in social perceptual and cognitive processes were of interest: "the dorsal, middle and ventral parts of medial prefrontal cortex (DMPFC, MMPFC and VMPFC), right and left temporo-parietal junctions (RTPJ and LTPJ), right superior temporal sulcus (RSTS) and temporal pole, and posterior medial cortices [posterior cingulate, precuneus (PC)]." In general, participants' activity in several of those brain regions tracked the episode's socially awkward moments to similar extents—the results were evidence of a lack of group difference except in one region: their activity near the RTPJ, spanning into the posterior end of the RSTS, showed notable quantitative differences between the ASD and NT groups (with ASD group showing lower activity).

Research reported in 2016 on ASC-related structural or physiological differences found using neuroimaging noted that results are often inconsistent across the literature, which could be caused by a variety of variance sources. (Re-)analysis using a technique they developed to reduce one common external source of variance showed group differences in TPJ. However, although statistically significant, results did not display the discriminative power sufficient to classify diagnostic groups, instead yielding accuracy results close to random. They concluded that ASD is a highly heterogeneous syndrome/diagnostic category whose differences from NT controls are difficult to characterize globally using neuroimaging.

=== Schizophrenia ===
The decreased ability for schizophrenia patients to function in social situations has been related to a deficit within the theory of mind process. There have been relatively few studies that have examined the role of theory of mind in schizophrenia patients; the findings of these studies as they relate to the activation of the TPJ are varied. Some studies have found decreased activation of the TPJ in schizophrenia patients who were asked to make inferences about other peoples' social intentions based on cartoons; other studies, however, performed similar assessments of schizophrenia patients and found that the TPJ actually became hyperactive, compared to control individuals without schizophrenia, in the TPJ. This indicates that there is abnormal activation of the TPJ in these patients while performing tasks that involving understanding social intention of others, but the directionality of this abnormal activity is not clear, or possibly not universal throughout schizophrenia patients. It was found that the changes in activation in the TPJ were lateralized; they found that there was reduced activity in only the right TPJ and proposed that based on previous research about the different roles of the right and left TPJ the findings indicated that there was a more general deficit in the overall mentalizing process for these patients, but their ability to understand other individuals' basic social intentions through observing interaction is not impaired.

A study found that there was a connection between the auditory hallucinations in schizophrenia and the TPJ; the TPJ has been determined as a critical node in the auditory-verbal hallucination system. This study found that there was a significant decrease in the connectivity between the left TPJ and the right hemispheric homotope of the Broca's area, which is related to the production of language that is also characteristic of AVH events. This aspect of impairment seen in schizophrenia patients may also be related to the involvement of the TPJ with producing out of body experiences.

=== Anxiety disorders ===
A recent study showed reduced activity in the TPJ of adolescents compared to adults during an extinction task, suggesting a role for the TPJ in anxiety disorders.

=== Future of possible treatments ===
Vasopressin is a neuropeptide that is involved in regulating social behaviors, including social memory and recognition. One study examined the connection between vasopressin and cortical areas that are involved in processing social interactions including the TPJ. This study looked specifically at the brain regions that were active in men who were given vasopressin and tested based on familiarity related tasks. They found that the introduction of vasopressin caused a localized specific change in social recognition-related activity in the left TPJ/Brodmann area 39; the presence of vasopressin diminishes the heightened activity in the left TPJ that is present upon exposure to an unfamiliar social stimulus indicating that the presence of vasopressin leads individuals to associate an unfamiliar face with a familiar category more readily. While recognizing that this is the first study that has looked into this connection, the authors propose that it has potential to lead into further research about regulating the TPJ with vasopressin or a similar compound, which could allow pharmacologists to target this area of the brain and help with certain disorders including autism, social anxiety disorder. Perhaps such an approach could also be used to treat certain symptoms of schizophrenia or other disorders with know social cognitive impairments.

== Current research ==
Current research involving the TPJ is extensive, ranging from issues of physiology to issues of mental state. A wide range of cognitive processes rely on the TPJ and as such gaining information about it is crucial. Research is conducted by studying the role TPJ plays both with and without lesions when stimulated, and with task-based fMRI. Research concerns various issues such as theory of mind, out-of-body experiences, temporal order judgments, morality, etc. This is a growing field due to the prevalence of ailments that involve TPJ as well as because of the importance of perception in everyday life.

=== Theory of mind ===
Theory of mind requires the collaboration of functionally related regions of the brain to form the distinction between self and other mental states and to create a comprehensive understanding of those mental states so that we may recognize, understand, and predict behavior. In general the theory of mind process is mediated by the dopaminergic-serotonergic system, which involves the TPJ as well as other associative regions necessary for mentalizing. Recent studies suggest that both the left TPJ, working in conjunction with the frontal cortex, and the right TPJ are involved in the representation of mental states; furthermore they suggest that the TPJ is particularly active in making the distinction between the mental states of self and others. A study in Nature Neuroscience from 2004 describes how the TPJ is involved in processing socially relevant cues including gaze direction and goal-directed action and also explains that results from the study show that lesions to this area of the brain result in an impaired ability to detect another persons belief. Moreover, studies have reported an increase in activity in the TPJ when patients are absorbing information through reading or images regarding other peoples' beliefs but not while observing information about physical control stimuli. Some studies, however, have shown that the TPJ, along with the cingulate cortex, is more specifically involved with attributing beliefs, but the process of mentalizing more generally is associated more with the medial prefrontal cortex. Another study in Current Biology from 2012 identifies the importance of the TPJ in both low-level, such as simple discrimination, and high-level, such as the ability to empathize, sociocognitive operations. In July 2011, a review from Neuropsychologia presented a model of the mentalizing network that established that mental states are first detected in the TPJ. The TPJ is composed of two discrete anatomical regions, the inferior parietal lobule (IPL) and the caudal parts of the superior temporal sulcus (pSTS), and both are active in the process of distinction between mental states of different individuals; thus, it is probable that this detection is the outcome of the combination and coordination of these two parts. Additionally, the right TPJ is involved in the ventral attention stream and contributes to the ability to focus attention on a particular stimuli or objective. It has also been observed that the interaction and communication between the dorsal and ventral streams involves the TPJ.

=== Out-of-body experiences ===
The TPJ is also a crucial structure for self-processing. Several neuro-imaging studies have shown an activation of the TPJ during different aspects of self-processing such as visuo-spatial perspective, self-other distinction, mental own body imagery, and vestibular and multi sensory integration. Damage in the TPJ has been linked to out-of-body experiences (OBEs), the feeling that one's self is located outside one's physical body.

An OBE is defined by the presence of three characteristics: disembodiment, the impression of seeing the world from a distant and elevated visuo-spatial perspective, and the impression of seeing one's own body from this elevated perspective. OBEs mostly occur to people with epilepsy or migraines, but approximately 10% of the healthy population also experience OBEs once or twice in a lifetime. They usually occur spontaneously and are of short duration, making OBEs hard to study. Here is an example of a patient describing what he or she experienced during an OBE:

"I was in bed and about to fall asleep when I had the distinct impression that 'I' was at the ceiling level looking down at my body in the bed. I was very startled and frightened; immediately [afterward] I felt that, I was consciously back in the bed again."

It is suggested that OBEs are caused by multi-sensory disintegration in the TPJ disrupting different aspects of self-processing such as illusory reduplication, illusory self-location, and illusory perspective. The brain integrates different sensory inputs to create a representation of one's body and its location in its surrounding. Some inhibition of discrepant inputs is required to have coherency, but in some cases, those discrepant inputs are so strong and come from more than one sensory source that it leads to two different representations of one's own body. This multi-sensory disintegration at the TPJ leads to OBEs. An electromagnetic stimulation to the right TPJ of a patient with epilepsy induced an OBE. The author also states that these experiences are closely related to schizophrenia and phantom limb.

=== Temporal order judgement ===
Temporal order is the arrangement of events in time. By judging this, one can understand how we process things. Temporal order judgments require an individual to determine the relative timing between two spatially separate events. One study revealed that subjects had to determine the order of appearance of two objects as well as which object fit a certain property better. What was learned from this study was that when identifying the order or appearance, fMRI studies showed that there was bilateral activation of the TPJ. Meanwhile, when it comes to object characterization based on a property, it was noticed that there was only activation of the lTPJ. As such, it is evident that TPJ is involved in the "when" pathway of the brain.

=== Morality ===
Part of judging how virtuous an action was, whether someone is an ethical person or what one ought to do, morality usually (among other considerations) differentiates by actor intention. This applies to self-assessment as well as of others.

Connections made at the TPJ help an individual understand their emotions: the TPJ allows association of emotions with events or individuals, aiding in any related decision-making process. Studies also show a relation between theory of mind and moral judgment, which further implicates the rTPJ in morality cognition.

However, errors in this emotional processing can arise when patients have lesions in the TPJ or when the brain is electrically stimulated. Transcranial magnetic stimulation (TMS) to the rTPJ seems to affect the ability of an individual, when they make moral decisions, to consider actors' mental states. Patients' general ability to judge moral scenarios was not obviously impaired, but it did seem to specifically affect how much they integrated a protagonist's belief into the judgement—only affecting the judgement of a scenario in which the protagonist explicitly intends and so deliberately acts to cause significant harm but completely fails solely due to an incorrect belief (about tool/weapon used). TMS can be used to disrupt neural activity in the rTPJ just before a patient was to make a moral decision or during that decision-making process—constituting two different testing environments, but experimental results were unaffected.

== See also ==
- Amnesia
- Default mode network
- Morality
- Out-of-body experience
- Theory of mind
