= Paragraphia =

Writing disorder

Paragraphia is a condition which results in the use of unintended letters or phonemes, words or syllables when writing. This is typically an acquired disorder derived from brain damage, and it results in a diminished ability to effectively use written expression.

Paragraphias can be classified as function of the type of writing errors: literal paragraphias, graphemic paragraphias, and morphemic paragraphias.
