= Supramarginal gyrus =

Gyrus of the parietal lobe of the brain

- Lateral view of a human brain, main gyri labeled

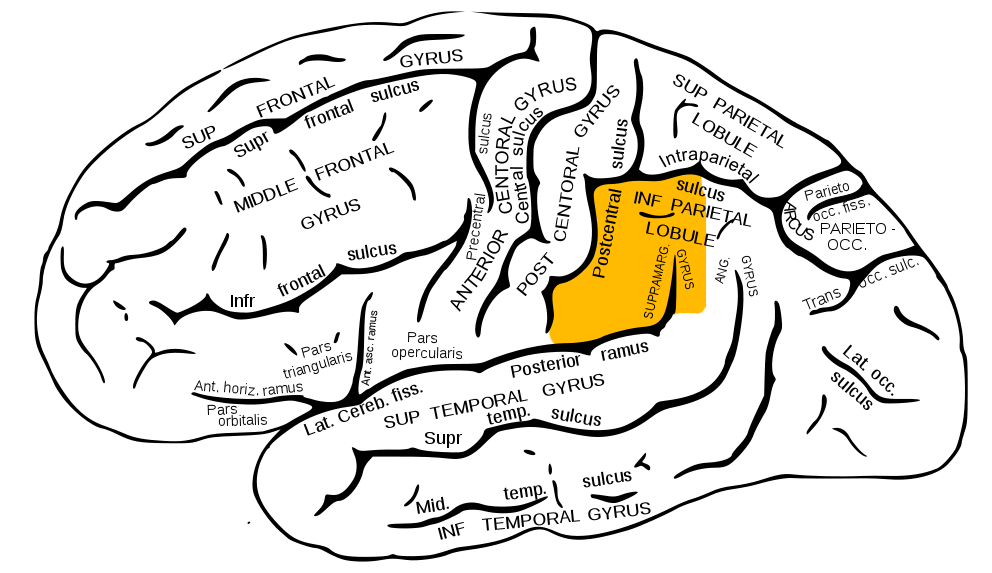
- Lateral surface of left cerebral hemisphere, viewed from the side (supramarginal gyrus shown in orange)

Details

Identifiers
- Latin: gyrus supramarginalis
- NeuroNames: 108
- NeuroLex ID: birnlex_1381
- TA98: A14.1.09.131
- TA2: 5473
- FMA: 61897

The supramarginal gyrus is a portion of the parietal lobe. This area of the brain is also known as Brodmann area 40 based on the brain map created by Korbinian Brodmann to define the structures in the cerebral cortex. It is probably involved with language perception and processing, and lesions in it may cause receptive aphasia.

== Important functions ==
The supramarginal gyrus is part of the somatosensory association cortex, which interprets tactile sensory data and is involved in perception of space and limbs location. It is also involved in identifying postures and gestures of other people and is thus a part of the mirror neuron system.

The right-hemisphere supramarginal gyrus appears to play a central role in controlling empathy towards other people. When this structure is not working properly or when individuals have to make very quick judgements, empathy becomes severely limited. Research has shown that disrupting the neurons in the right supramarginal gyrus causes humans to project emotions on others, inhibiting the ability to be empathetic. In addition, this disruption also causes people to be more egocentric, mainly because they are not able to perceive the emotions of those around them. Both the left and right supramarginal gyri of healthy, right-handed individuals are shown to be active when making phonological word choices. Individuals who had lesions to the left hemisphere had more difficulty than those with lesions to the right hemisphere, reinforcing the dominance of the left hemisphere in language.

== Relationships to surrounding structures ==
The supramarginal gyrus is located just anterior to the angular gyrus allowing these two structures (which comprise the inferior parietal lobule) to form a multimodal complex that receives somatosensory, visual, and auditory inputs from the brain. Although the supramarginal gyrus is not considered a major portion of the language circuit, it still works with the angular gyrus to attempt to link words with meanings. It is also bound caudally by the lateral sulcus, one of the most prominent structures found in the brain.

== Additional images ==
Position of supramarginal gyrus (shown in red).

== See also ==
- Brodmann area 40
