= Constructional apraxia =

Neurological movement disorder

Constructional apraxia is a neurological disorder in which people are unable to perform tasks or movements even though they understand the task, are willing to complete it, and have the physical ability to perform the movements. It is characterized by an inability or difficulty to build, assemble, or draw objects. Constructional apraxia may be caused by lesions in the parietal lobe following stroke or it may serve as an indicator for Alzheimer's disease.

== Signs and symptoms ==
A key deficit in constructional apraxia patients is the inability to correctly copy or draw an image. There are qualitative differences between patients with left hemisphere damage, right hemisphere damage, and Alzheimer's disease.

=== Left hemisphere damage ===
Patients with damage to their left hemisphere tend to preserve items, oversimplify drawing features and omit details when drawing from memory. In addition, left hemisphere patients are less likely to systematically arrange the parts of their drawing.

=== Right hemisphere damage ===
Patients with damage to their right hemisphere have trouble correctly replicating spatial relationships of complex figures. Drawing elements are often piecemeal, transposed to different positions or orientations, or shown diagonally on the page. As a result, right hemisphere patients tend to produce asymmetric or distorted drawings characterized by hemispatial neglect, the omission of elements from one side of the model. It was once thought that right hemisphere patients were twice as likely to make mistakes in 3D construction tasks as left hemisphere patients but this inaccurate conclusion was attributable to participant selection bias in that researchers excluded from studies individuals with severe left hemisphere lesions due to the debilitating language impairments of those individuals. However, included in studies were individuals with severe right hemisphere lesions. Subsequent research has substantiated the absence of a marked difference in performance between left and right hemisphere patients on 3D construction tasks.

=== Alzheimer's disease ===
Alzheimer's disease patients with constructional apraxia have unique symptoms. Their drawings contain fewer angles, spatial alterations, a lack of perspective and simplifications, which are uncharacteristic of left hemisphere or right hemisphere patients. Constructional disabilities are present early on in the disease and get progressively worse over time; however even patients with advanced Alzheimer's disease may be able to do some constructional tasks. Spontaneous drawing is affected early and is heavily dependent upon semantic memory; therefore simplifications in the drawing may be due to impaired access to semantic knowledge. As Alzheimer's disease progresses, the patient's ability to copy objects becomes increasingly impaired and they may lose the ability to draw correctly a simple figure due to a motor loss in routine memories.

== Causes ==
Constructional apraxia cannot be localized to a specific hemisphere or cerebral area because drawing and constructional tasks require both perceptual and motor functioning. It has been linked to parietal lesions in the left and right hemisphere, stroke and Alzheimer's disease.

Initially, researchers tried to isolate the cause to left hemisphere lesions in the parietal lobe because of its similarities to Gerstmann syndrome; however, lesions in the dorsal stream also result in visual agnosia and a piecemeal drawing. Although constructional apraxia can result from lesions in any part of the brain, it is most commonly associated with lesions in the parietal-occipital lobes. Constructional apraxia is common after right parietal stroke and it continues after visuospatial symptoms have subsided. Patients with posterior and parietal lobe lesions tend to have the most severe symptoms.

In Alzheimer's disease research, the AT8 antibody has proven to be an early indicator of tau protein pathology. Constructional apraxia patients with the most AT8 pathology were least able to copy an image, while those best able to had the least neuritic pathology. Therefore, figure copying ability is highly correlated with Alzheimer's disease pathology.

== Mechanisms ==
=== Drawing ===
As the study of constructional apraxia impairments narrows, research is concentrating on analyzing drawing abilities. Drawing abilities may be decomposed into three steps: visual perception, visual imagery, and graphic production.

According to the two-streams hypothesis, as information exits the occipital lobe it follows two pathways. The dorsal stream ("where pathway") ends in the parietal lobe while the ventral stream ("what pathway") terminates in the temporal lobe. Damage to the parietal lobe is highly correlated with constructional apraxia since it is involved in drawing and copying. The parietal lobe is also critical for remapping spatial position across saccades. There is an attentional subsystem responsible for moving the eyes, head, and body to focus on different images. Damage at various levels of this system could lead to trouble localizing a stimulus or hemispatial neglect which manifests as perseverative errors on the drawing. There are a couple theories used to describe the neurological mechanisms behind drawing.

==== Kosslyn and Koeing model ====
Kosslyn proposes that there is an early split of information in the dorsal stream. The first pathway captures coordinate relations by defining distances between points in space. These points become a continuum which can transform into other points through intermediate points. This coding of points would allow space to be perceived qualitatively, which would also help with movement.

The other pathway encodes "categorical" information, which synthesizes information about the shape and spatial arrangement of an objects parts. It decomposes objects into their most basic form, by looking for boundaries, lines, or patches. These categorical relations in turn lead to abstract spatial relations that allow one to perceive objects as being "on top," "inside," "between," "beside," etc.

==== Van Sommers model ====
The Van Sommers model describes two hierarchical systems for drawing: one for visual perception, another for graphic production. The visual perception model utilizes David Marr's three stage system to describe visual perception in copying. In the first stage, an image us represented in 2D based on changes in intensity. Foreground and background are not distinguished. In the second stage, a 2.5D representation is formed which encodes the object in a viewer-centered coordinate system. Finally a 3D object-centered representation is established making it possible to appreciate volume. Visual representations of familiar drawings are stored in memory. This representation sends feedback to the other areas of the brain which encoded the spatial and physical properties of the object. Feedback from these areas allows the drawer to successfully encode the coordinate and categorical relations.

In the graphic production model, the viewer begins by making a series of depiction decisions about the dimensions, amount of detail to include, etc. Depiction decisions are not used when copying a drawing because they're dictated by the situation. Next, the production strategy is formed. If the drawing is unfamiliar, then the drawer will divide and rank the different portions of the drawings. If the drawing is familiar (e.g. a sun), then the drawer will reproduce the item line by lie regardless of the pictures organization due to automatic execution. The third component, contingent planning, reflects the importance of planning in drawing. Contingent planning is a result of production strategy. If the drawing is unfamiliar and requires a segmented approach, then the most appropriate sequence is determined before the drawing. At this point, the drawing task becomes a problem solving task. The fourth and final component of the model refers to the articulatory and economic constraints placed on the drawer by using a pencil. Certain directions are favored due to the orientation of the hand and fingers, etc. However, some feel the Van Sommers model does not adequately account for all aspects of drawing.

==== Other theories ====
Drawing from memory in response to a verbal order requires the image to be recalled from associative memory and brought into the visual buffer. Once there, it can be successfully drawn and copied from memory. Familiar images (like the sun) may not require visual imagery to draw, as the production schemes and action programming stored in the associative memory and procedural memory may be sufficient to reproduce the drawing.

=== Construction ===
Construction problems are usually caused by visual perception deficits. They require normal vision and the ability to execute a series of motor activities. When looking at performance, it is important to consider perceptual and executive functioning. A patient with trouble visually recognizing patterns or spatial relations may have difficulty correctly building a model. In addition, problems planning, organizing, or carrying out action may impede the ability to solve a construction problem.

=== Neuropsychological mechanisms ===

Modern attempts to understand constructional apraxia have moved away from anatomical functions towards a cognitive neuropsychological approach. Both adults and children alike experience difficulty reproducing oblique lines. Some feel that these deficiencies may be attributed to planning since it is easier to plan horizontal and vertical lines than oblique lines. Research indicates that both adults and children are more able to draw squares than diamonds, although as children grow into adults they are more accurately able to depict diamonds.

One study showed that constructional apraxia patients were significantly less accurate than the control patients in producing angles with vertical and horizontal orientations. In this study, constructional apraxia patients drew patterns usually found in children 8 and younger. Gregory argues that ontogenetically and phylogenetically earlier behavioral traits are present in the brain, but inhibited. When these inhibitory mechanisms become compromised, then the childlike behavior patterns re-emerge. Therefore, according to this theory, the inhibitory mechanisms in patients with constructional apraxia have failed, causing them to draw like young children who have difficulty drawing oblique lines.

== Diagnosis ==
Constructional disabilities are often tested by asking the patient to draw a 2D model or assemble an object. Some researchers feel that neuronal mechanisms involved in drawing and copying differ, thus they should be tested individually. Free drawing is a commonly used test in which the patient is asked to draw a named object. It can be an effective tool in measuring the patient's ability to maintain spatial relations, organize the drawing, and draw complete shapes. The complexity of the task should be noted as such tasks often require lexical-semantic abilities as well as imagery abilities.

== Treatment ==
Motor imagery has been explored as a potential therapy for constructional apraxia patients. Motor imagery is a process by which a specific action is mimicked in the working memory without a corresponding motor output. Since constructional apraxia is a visuospatial problem not a motor problem, rehabilitation-treatment based on motor imagery has not proven to be an effective in patients with right hemisphere stroke or hemispatial neglect.

== History ==
In 1934, Karl Kleist characterized constructional apraxia as a disturbance "in formative activities such as assembling, building and drawing, in which the spatial form of the product proves to be unsuccessful, without there being an apraxia for single movements." In the years following, the definition of constructional apraxia diverged. There were those who felt it was an executive processing order and those who felt it was a visuospatial disorder. Due to discrepancies in definitions, constructional apraxia became a blanket term to describe any kind of constructional impairment. Modern researchers question whether the term "apraxia" is appropriate to describe this condition.
