= Gerstmann syndrome =

Neuropsychological disorder caused by damage to the inferior parietal lobule

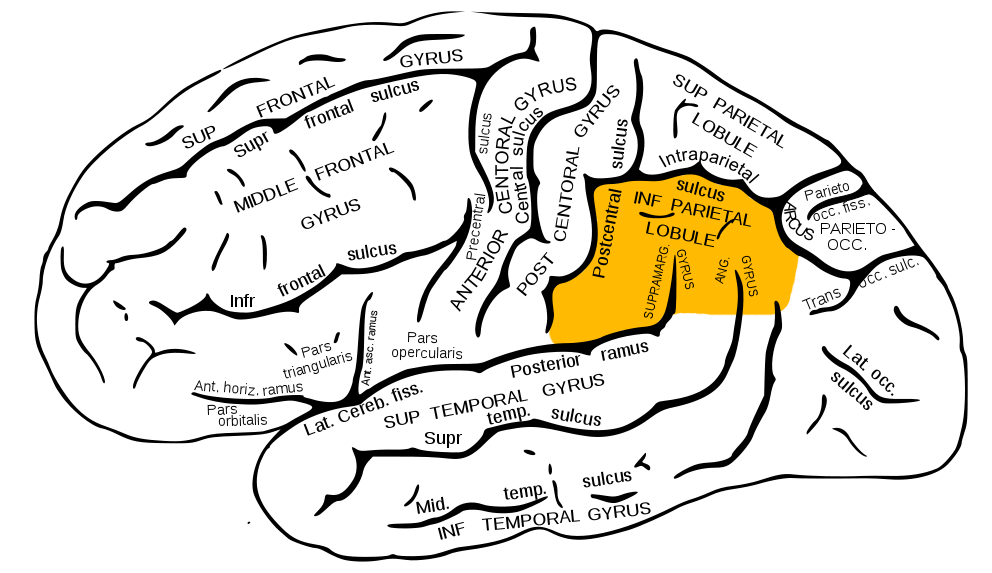
- The inferior parietal lobule, with damage in this area most often associated with Gerstmann syndrome
- Specialty: Neurology, neuropsychology
- Symptoms: Dysgraphia, dyscalculia, finger agnosia, left-right disorientation, constructional apraxia, aphasia
- Causes: Idiopathic, stroke, dementia

Gerstmann syndrome is a neurological disorder that is characterized by a constellation of symptoms that suggests the presence of a lesion usually near the junction of the temporal and parietal lobes at or near the angular gyrus. Gerstmann syndrome is typically associated with damage to the inferior parietal lobule of the dominant hemisphere. It is classically considered a left-hemisphere disorder, although right-hemisphere damage has also been associated with components of the syndrome.

It is named after Jewish Austrian-born American neurologist Josef Gerstmann.

== Symptoms ==
Gerstmann syndrome is characterized by four primary symptoms, collectively referred to as a tetrad:

1. Dysgraphia/agraphia: deficiency in the ability to write
2. Dyscalculia/acalculia: difficulty in learning or comprehending mathematics
3. Finger agnosia: inability to distinguish the fingers on the hand
4. Left-right disorientation

== Causes ==
This disorder is often associated with brain lesions in the dominant (usually left) hemisphere including the angular and supramarginal gyri (Brodmann area 39 and 40 respectively) near the temporal and parietal lobe junction. There is significant debate in the scientific literature as to whether Gerstmann syndrome truly represents a unified, theoretically motivated syndrome. Thus its diagnostic utility has been questioned by neurologists and neuropsychologists alike. The angular gyrus is generally involved in translating visual patterns of letters and words into meaningful information, such as is done while reading.

=== In adults ===
In adults, the syndrome may occur after a stroke. In addition to exhibiting the above symptoms, many adults also experience dysphasia or aphasia, which is difficulty in expressing oneself when speaking, in understanding speech, or in reading and writing.

=== In children ===
There are few reports of the syndrome, sometimes called developmental Gerstmann syndrome, in children. The cause is not known. Most cases are identified when children reach school age, a time when they are challenged with writing and mathematic exercises. Generally, children with the disorder exhibit poor handwriting and spelling skills, and difficulty with math functions, including adding, subtracting, multiplying, and dividing. An inability to differentiate right from left and to discriminate among individual fingers may also be apparent. In addition to the four primary symptoms, many children also have constructional apraxia, an inability to copy simple drawings. Frequently, there is also an impairment in reading. Children at any level of intelligence may be affected with the disorder.

== Diagnosis ==
Diagnosis may be clinical if associated with dementia and other etiologies. In cases caused by stroke, MRI will show a corresponding stroke in the inferior parietal lobule. In the acute stage, this will be bright (restricted diffusion) on the DWI sequence and dark at the corresponding area on the ADC sequence.

== Treatment ==
There is no cure for Gerstmann syndrome. Treatment is symptomatic and supportive. Occupational and speech therapies may help diminish the dysgraphia and apraxia. In addition, calculators and word processors may help school children cope with the symptoms of the disorder.

== Prognosis ==
In adults, many of the symptoms diminish over time. Although it has been suggested that a similar diminishing of symptoms occurs in children as well, it appears more likely that most do not overcome their deficits, but instead simply learn to adjust.

== See also ==
- Pure alexia, another left sided lesion that does not result in agraphia, despite being next to the area where lesions cause Gerstmann syndrome.
