= Apraxia =

Inability to perform purposeful movements

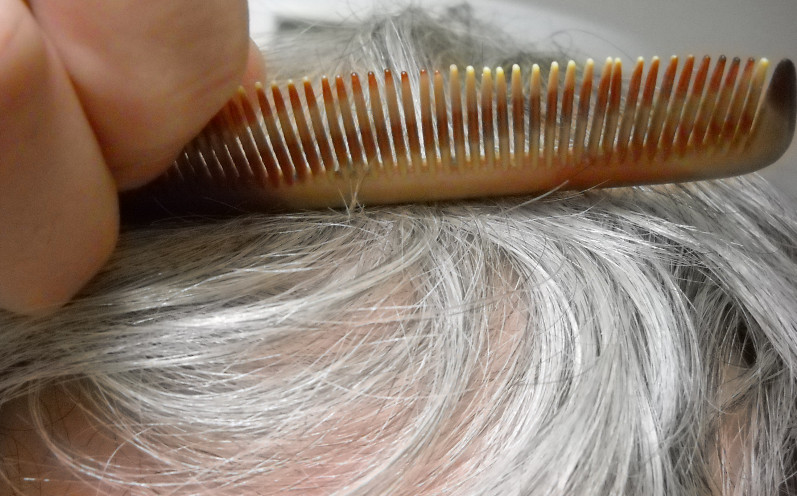
- Apraxia is characterized by loss of the ability to execute or carry out learned purposeful movements.
- Specialty: Neurology, psychiatry
- Treatment: Occupational therapy, physical therapy

Apraxia is a motor disorder caused by damage to the brain (specifically the posterior parietal cortex or corpus callosum), which causes difficulty with motor planning to perform tasks or movements. The nature of the damage determines the disorder's severity, and the absence of sensory loss or paralysis helps to explain the level of difficulty. Children may be born with apraxia; its cause is unknown, and symptoms are usually noticed in the early stages of development. Apraxia occurring later in life, known as acquired apraxia, is typically caused by traumatic brain injury, stroke, dementia, Alzheimer's disease, brain tumor, or other neurodegenerative disorders. The multiple types of apraxia are categorized by the specific ability and/or body part affected.

The term apraxia comes from Ancient Greek ἀ- (a-) 'without' and πρᾶξις (praxis) 'action'.

== Types ==
The several types of apraxia include:

- Apraxia of speech (AOS) is having difficulty planning and coordinating the movements necessary for speech (e.g., potato=totapo, topato). AOS can independently occur without issues in areas such as verbal comprehension, reading comprehension, writing, articulation, or prosody.
- Buccofacial or orofacial apraxia, the most common type of apraxia, is the inability to carry out facial movements on demand. For example, an inability to lick one's lips, wink, or whistle when requested to do so. This suggests an inability to carry out volitional movements of the tongue, cheeks, lips, pharynx, or larynx on command.
- Constructional apraxia is the inability to draw, construct, or copy simple configurations, such as intersecting shapes. These patients have difficulty copying a simple diagram or drawing basic shapes.
- Gait apraxia is the loss of ability to have normal function of the lower limbs such as walking. This is not due to loss of motor or sensory functions.
- Ideational/conceptual apraxia is having an inability to conceptualize a task and impaired ability to complete multistep actions. This form of apraxia consists of an inability to select and carry out an appropriate motor program. For example, the patient may complete actions in incorrect orders, such as buttering bread before putting it in the toaster, or putting on shoes before putting on socks. Also, a loss occurs in the ability to voluntarily perform a learned task when given the necessary objects or tools. For instance, if given a screwdriver, these patients may try to write with it as if it were a pen, or try to comb their hair with a toothbrush.
- Ideomotor apraxia is having deficits in the ability to plan or complete motor actions that rely on semantic memory. These patients are able to explain how to perform an action, but unable to "imagine" or act out a movement such as "pretend to brush your teeth" or "pucker as though you bit into a sour lemon." When the ability to perform an action automatically when cued remains intact, though, this is known as automatic-voluntary dissociation. For example, they may not be able to pick up a phone when asked to do so, but can perform the action without thinking when the phone rings.
- Limb-kinetic apraxia is having the inability to perform precise, voluntary movements of extremities. For example, a person affected by limb apraxia may have difficulty waving hello, tying shoes, or typing on a computer. This type is common in patients who have experienced a stroke, some type of brain trauma, or have Alzheimer's disease.
- Oculomotor apraxia is having difficulty moving the eye on command, especially with saccade movements that direct the gaze to targets. This is one of the three major components of Balint's syndrome.

== Causes ==
Apraxia is most often due to a lesion located in the dominant (usually left) hemisphere of the brain, typically in the frontal and parietal lobes. Lesions may be due to stroke, acquired brain injuries, or neurodegenerative diseases such as Alzheimer's disease or other dementias, Parkinson's disease, or Huntington's disease. Also, apraxia possibly may be caused by lesions in other areas of the brain.

Ideomotor apraxia is typically due to a decrease in blood flow to the dominant hemisphere of the brain and particularly the parietal and premotor areas. It is frequently seen in patients with corticobasal degeneration.

Ideational apraxia has been observed in patients with lesions in the dominant hemisphere near areas associated with aphasia, but more research is needed on ideational apraxia due to brain lesions. The localization of lesions in areas of the frontal and temporal lobes would provide explanation for the difficulty in motor planning seen in ideational apraxia, as well as its difficulty to distinguish it from certain aphasias.

Constructional apraxia is often caused by lesions of the inferior nondominant parietal lobe, and can be caused by brain injury, illness, tumor, or other condition that can result in a brain lesion.

== Diagnosis ==
Although qualitative and quantitative studies exist, little consensus exists on the proper method to assess for apraxia. The criticisms of past methods include failure to meet standard psychometric properties and research-specific designs that translate poorly to nonresearch use.

The Test to Measure Upper Limb Apraxia (TULIA) is one method of determining upper limb apraxia through the qualitative and quantitative assessment of gesture production. In contrast to previous publications on apraxic assessment, the reliability and validity of TULIA was thoroughly investigated. The TULIA consists of subtests for the imitation and pantomime of nonsymbolic ("put your index finger on top of your nose"), intransitive ("wave goodbye"), and transitive ("show me how to use a hammer") gestures. Discrimination (differentiating between well- and poorly performed tasks) and recognition (indicating which object corresponds to a pantomimed gesture) tasks are also often tested for a full apraxia evaluation.

However, a strong correlation may not be seen between formal test results and actual performance in everyday functioning or activities of daily living (ADLs). A comprehensive assessment of apraxia should include formal testing, standardized measurements of ADLs, observation of daily routines, self-report questionnaires, and targeted interviews with the patients and their relatives.

As stated above, apraxia should not be confused with aphasia (the inability to understand language); however, they frequently occur together. Apraxia is so often accompanied by aphasia that many believe that if a person displays AOS, then the patient also having some level of aphasia should be assumed.

== Treatment ==
Treatment for individuals with apraxia includes speech therapy, occupational therapy, and physical therapy. Currently, no medications are indicated for the treatment of apraxia, only therapy treatments. Generally, treatments for apraxia have received little attention for several reasons, including the tendency for the condition to resolve spontaneously in acute cases. Additionally, the very nature of the automatic-voluntary dissociation of motor abilities that defines apraxia means that patients may still be able to automatically perform activities if cued to do so in daily life. Nevertheless, patients experiencing apraxia have less functional independence in their daily lives, and that evidence for the treatment of apraxia is scarce. However, a literature review of apraxia treatment to date reveals that although the field is in its early stages of treatment design, certain aspects can be included to treat apraxia.

One method is through rehabilitative treatment, which has been found to positively impact apraxia, as well as ADLs. In this review, rehabilitative treatment consisted of 12 different contextual cues, which were used to teach patients how to produce the same gesture under different contextual situations. Additional studies have also recommended varying forms of gesture therapy, whereby the patient is instructed to make gestures (either using objects or symbolically meaningful and nonmeaningful gestures) with progressively less cuing from the therapist. Patients with apraxia may need to use a form of alternative and augmentative communication depending on the severity of the disorder. In addition to using gestures as mentioned, patients can also use communication boards or more sophisticated electronic devices if needed.

No single type of therapy or approach has been proven as the best way to treat a patient with apraxia, since each patient's case varies. One-on-one sessions usually work the best, though, with the support of family members and friends. Since everyone responds to therapy differently, some patients will make significant improvements, while others will make less progress. The overall goal for treatment of apraxia is to treat the motor plans for speech, not treating at the phoneme (sound) level. Individuals with apraxia of speech should receive treatment that focuses on the repetition of target words and rate of speech. The overall goal for treatment of apraxia should be to improve speech intelligibility, rate of speech, and articulation of targeted words.

== See also ==
- Praxis (process)
- Ataxia
- Aging movement control
- Developmental coordination disorder (also known as developmental dyspraxia)
- Lists of language disorders
