= Parietal lobe =

Part of the brain responsible for sensory input and some language processing

- Principal fissures and lobes of the cerebrum viewed laterally. (Parietal lobe is shown in yellow)

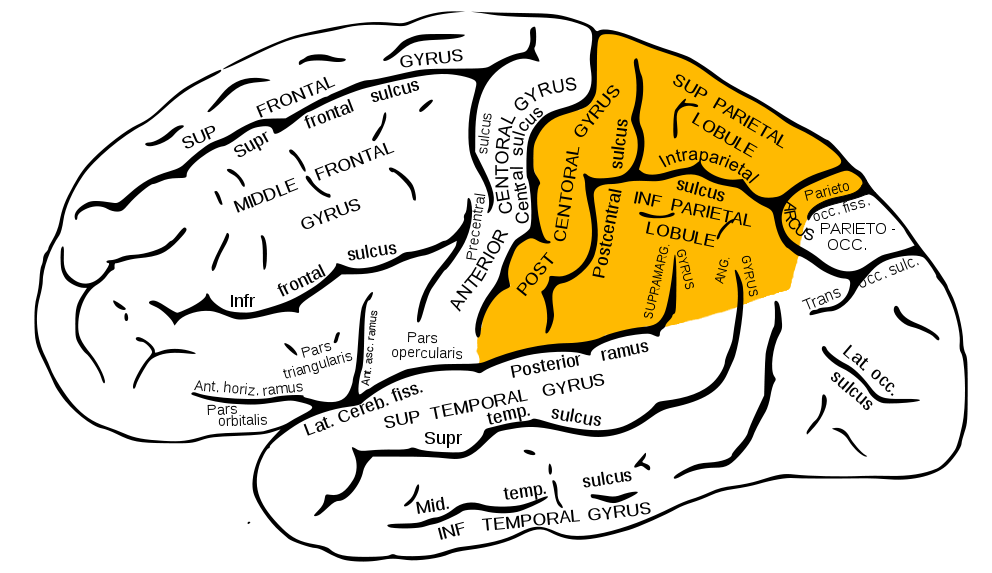
- Lateral surface of left cerebral hemisphere, viewed from the side. (Parietal lobe is shown in orange.)

Details
- Pronunciation: /pəˈraɪ.ɪtəl/ pə-RY-it-əl
- Part of: Cerebrum
- Artery: Anterior cerebral Middle cerebral
- Vein: Superior sagittal sinus

Identifiers
- Latin: lobus parietalis
- MeSH: D010296
- NeuroNames: 95
- NeuroLex ID: birnlex_1148
- TA98: A14.1.09.123
- TA2: 5467
- FMA: 61826

The parietal lobe is one of the four major lobes of the cerebral cortex in brains. The parietal lobe is positioned above the temporal lobe and behind the frontal lobe and central sulcus.

The parietal lobe integrates sensory information among various modalities, including spatial sense and navigation (proprioception), the main sensory receptive area for the sense of touch in the somatosensory cortex which is just posterior to the central sulcus in the postcentral gyrus, and the dorsal stream of the visual system. The major sensory inputs from the skin (touch, temperature, and pain receptors), relay through the thalamus to the parietal lobe.

Several areas of the parietal lobe are important in language processing. The somatosensory cortex can be illustrated as a distorted figure – the cortical homunculus (Latin: "little man") in which the body parts are rendered according to how much of the somatosensory cortex is devoted to them. The superior parietal lobule and inferior parietal lobule are the primary areas of body or spatial awareness. A lesion commonly in the right superior or inferior parietal lobule leads to hemispatial neglect.

The name comes from the parietal bone, which is named from the Latin paries-, meaning "wall".

== Structure ==
Animation. Parietal lobe (red) of left cerebral hemisphere.

The parietal lobe is defined by three anatomical boundaries: The central sulcus separates the parietal lobe from the frontal lobe; the parieto-occipital sulcus separates the parietal and occipital lobes; the lateral sulcus (sylvian fissure) is the most lateral boundary, separating it from the temporal lobe; and the longitudinal fissure divides the two hemispheres. Within each hemisphere, the somatosensory cortex represents the skin area on the contralateral surface of the body.

Immediately posterior to the central sulcus, and the most anterior part of the parietal lobe, is the postcentral gyrus (Brodmann area 3), the primary somatosensory cortical area. Separating this from the posterior parietal cortex is the postcentral sulcus.

The posterior parietal cortex can be subdivided into the superior parietal lobule (Brodmann areas 5 + 7) and the inferior parietal lobule (39 + 40), separated by the intraparietal sulcus (IPS). The intraparietal sulcus and adjacent gyri are essential in guidance of limb and eye movement, and—based on cytoarchitectural and functional differences—is further divided into medial (MIP), lateral (LIP), ventral (VIP), and anterior (AIP) areas.

== Function ==
Functions of the parietal lobe include:

- Two point discrimination – through touch alone without other sensory input (e.g. visual)
- Graphesthesia – recognizing writing on skin by touch alone
- Touch localization (bilateral simultaneous stimulation)

The parietal lobe plays important roles in integrating sensory information from various parts of the body, knowledge of numbers and their relations, and in the manipulation of objects. Its function also includes processing information relating to the sense of touch. Portions of the parietal lobe are involved with visuospatial processing. Although multisensory in nature, the posterior parietal cortex is often referred to by vision scientists as the dorsal stream of vision (as opposed to the ventral stream in the temporal lobe). This dorsal stream has been called both the "where" stream (as in spatial vision) and the "how" stream (as in vision for action). The posterior parietal cortex (PPC) receives somatosensory and visual input, which then, through motor signals, controls movement of the arm, hand, and eyes.

Various studies in the 1990s found that different regions of the posterior parietal cortex in macaques represent different parts of space.

- The lateral intraparietal (LIP) area contains a map of neurons (retinotopically-coded when the eyes are fixed) representing the saliency of spatial locations, and attention to these spatial locations. It can be used by the oculomotor system for targeting eye movements, when appropriate.
- The ventral intraparietal (VIP) area receives input from a number of senses (visual, somatosensory, auditory, and vestibular). Neurons with tactile receptive fields represent space in a head-centered reference frame. The cells with visual receptive fields also fire with head-centered reference frames but possibly also with eye-centered coordinates
- The medial intraparietal (MIP) area neurons encode the location of a reach target in eye-centered coordinates.
- The anterior intraparietal (AIP) area contains neurons responsive to shape, size, and orientation of objects to be grasped as well as for manipulation of the hands themselves, both to viewed and remembered stimuli. The AIP has neurons that are responsible for grasping and manipulating objects through motor and visual inputs. The AIP and ventral premotor together are responsible for visuomotor transformations for actions of the hand.

More recent fMRI studies have shown that humans have similar functional regions in and around the intraparietal sulcus and parietal-occipital junction. The human "parietal eye fields" and "parietal reach region", equivalent to LIP and MIP in the monkey, also appear to be organized in gaze-centered coordinates so that their goal-related activity is "remapped" when the eyes move.

Emerging evidence has linked processing in the inferior parietal lobe to declarative memory. Bilateral damage to this brain region does not cause amnesia however the strength of memory is diminished, details of complex events become harder to retrieve, and subjective confidence in memory is very low. This has been interpreted as reflecting either deficits in internal attention, deficits in subjective memory states, or problems with the computation that allows evidence to accumulate, thus allowing decisions to be made about internal representations.

== Clinical significance ==
Features of parietal lobe lesions are as follows:

- Unilateral parietal lobe
  - Contralateral hemisensory loss
  - Astereognosis – inability to determine 3-D shape by touch.
  - Agraphaesthesia – inability to read numbers or letters drawn on hand, with eyes shut.
  - Contralateral homonymous inferior quadrantanopia
  - Asymmetry of optokinetic nystagmus (OKN)
  - Sensory seizures
- Dominant hemisphere
  - Conduction aphasia
  - Dyslexia – a general term for disorders that can involve difficulty in learning to read or interpret words, letters, and other symbols
  - Apraxia – inability to perform complex movements in the presence of normal motor, sensory and cerebellar function
  - Gerstmann syndrome – characterized by acalculia, agraphia, finger agnosia, and left-right disorientation
- Non-dominant hemisphere
  - Contralateral hemispatial neglect
  - Constructional apraxia
  - Dress apraxia
  - Anosognosia – lack of awareness of the existence of one's disability
- Bilateral hemispheres
  - Bálint's syndrome

Damage to this lobe in the right hemisphere results in the loss of imagery, visualization of spatial relationships and neglect of left-side space and left side of the body. Even drawings may be neglected on the left side. Damage to this lobe in the left hemisphere will result in problems in mathematics, long reading, writing, and understanding symbols. The parietal association cortex enables individuals to read, write, and solve mathematical problems. The sensory inputs from the right side of the body go to the left side of the brain and vice versa.

The syndrome of hemispatial neglect is usually associated with large deficits of attention of the non-dominant hemisphere. Optic ataxia is associated with difficulties reaching toward objects in the visual field opposite to the side of the parietal damage. Some aspects of optic ataxia have been explained in terms of the functional organization described above.

Apraxia is a disorder of motor control which can be referred neither to "elemental" motor deficits nor to general cognitive impairment. The concept of apraxia was shaped by Hugo Liepmann. Apraxia is predominantly a symptom of left brain damage, but some symptoms of apraxia can also occur after right brain damage.

Amorphosynthesis is a loss of perception on one side of the body caused by a lesion in the parietal lobe. Usually, left-sided lesions cause agnosia, a full-body loss of perception, while right-sided lesions cause lack of recognition of the person's left side and extrapersonal space. The term amorphosynthesis was coined by D. Denny-Brown to describe patients he studied in the 1950s.

Can also result in sensory impairment where one of the affected person's senses (sight, hearing, smell, touch, taste and spatial awareness) is no longer normal.

== See also ==
- Lobes of the brain
- Temporoparietal junction
