= Language disorder =

Disorders that involve the processing of linguistic information

- Specialty: Speech–language pathology
- Symptoms: Trouble learning to read and write
- Risk factors: Low birth weight, prematurity, general birth complications, trauma, being male, family history, and low parental education
- Diagnostic method: Diagnosed by speech–language pathologists after screening and assessment
- Differential diagnosis: Speech disorders
- Treatment: Speech and language therapy (Note: Attributed to multiple sources:)
- Frequency: Approximately 7%

Language disorders or language impairments are disorders that cause persistent difficulty in the acquisition and use of listening and speaking skills. These difficulties may involve any of the five domains of language: phonology, syntax, morphology, semantics, or pragmatics. Language disorders may affect listening comprehension, spoken language expression, reading comprehension, and/or written expression. There are two main categories of language disorders: expressive, which involves a difficulty using words to communicate, and receptive, which involves a difficulty understanding language. Language disorders may persist across the life span, and symptoms may change over time. A language disorder can occur in isolation or in the presence of other conditions. Language disorders may occur from birth or early childhood, or they may be acquired later from disease or injury.

In the United States, speech–language pathologists screen, assess, diagnose, and treat language disorders.

== Differentiation from speech disorders ==
Though the words language and speech are often colloquially used interchangeably, they have different meanings in the context of communication disorders. Language refers to the code used for transforming mental events into words and phrases that can be perceived by other people. Language disorders, then, are specific deficits in language comprehension, the ability to understand meaning from language; and language expression, the ability to encode ideas into language forms. Language disorders are distinct from speech disorders, which involve difficulty with the act of speech production, but not with the content of the communicative message. Speech refers specifically to the ability to properly produce sounds via the oral mechanism. Speech and language disorders can occur separately or together.

== Developmental language disorder ==
The term developmental language disorder (DLD) is used to refer to a spoken language disorder that is a primary disability without a known medical cause and persisting beyond childhood. This term is also used when the language disorder co-occurs with other diagnoses, but the causal relationship is not as obvious. Some research and legislation refers to this as a specific language impairment. Adults with DLD tend to struggle with finding words or organizing their thoughts in a way that is easy for the listener to comprehend. Children with DLD may use simple or ungrammatical sentences that are more age-appropriate for a much younger child. Current data indicates that approximately 7% of young children display developmental language disorder, with boys being diagnosed twice as often as girls in young children. People with language disorders often have trouble learning to read and write. Language disorders are also often found co-occurring with other neurodevelopmental and learning disorders, such as behavioral disorders, autism, Down syndrome, dyslexia, and attention deficit hyperactivity disorder. Preliminary research on potential risk factors have suggested biological components, such as low birth weight, prematurity, general birth complications, trauma, and male gender, as well as family history and low parental education can increase the chance of developing developmental language disorder.

== Aphasia ==
The term aphasia is used to refer to an acquired language disorder, usually resulting from damage to the left hemisphere of the brain, that affects language processing. Aphasia may be caused by a stroke, traumatic brain injury, or various neurodegenerative diseases. There are various types of aphasia, depending on the area of the brain affected.

=== Wernicke's aphasia ===
Wernicke's aphasia is characterized by impaired language comprehension for both spoken and written language, caused by damage to Wernicke's area. Patients with Wernicke's aphasia can still speak with normal fluency and prosody, and follow grammatical rules with normal sentence structure. However, they may exhibit difficulty with repetition tasks, naming items, and written word spelling.People with Wernicke's aphasia often exhibit other forms of aphasia. Phonemic paraphasia refers to making errors in the selection of phones, a vowel or consonant sound, including errors of addition, omission, or change in position. Semantic paraphasia is a common feature of Wernicke's aphasia that involves fluent speech that contains paraphasic errors resulting from the failure to select the proper words to convey one's ideas. This deficiency can be partially compensated for using paraphrases that rely on generic terms to stand in for the hard-to-find specific words.

=== Transcortical sensory aphasia ===
Transcortical sensory aphasia (TSA) has a lot in common with Wernicke's aphasia, as the causation brain damage are in areas of the brain very close to each other. Patients with TSA are able to produce connected, flowing speech that often lacks meaning due to word errors and invented words.

=== Broca's aphasia ===
Broca's aphasia is an expressive language disorder that affects one's ability to speak and produce language, often accompanied by a loss of normal grammatical structure. Symptoms include having trouble forming sentences, difficulty repeating phrases, and leaving out linking words, conjunctions, and prepositions. In patients with Broca's aphasia, language comprehension is intact and produced words are generally intelligible and contextually appropriate. This language disorder is caused by damage to Broca's area, the region in the left inferior frontal lobe, or its connections to other areas of the brain. The most common cause of Broca's aphasia is ischemic stroke. Other possible causes include traumatic brain injuries, tumors, infections, and neurodegenerative conditions.

=== Transcortical motor aphasia ===
Transcortical motor aphasia (TMA) is a type of non-fluent aphasia that's similar to Broca's aphasia, as it results form stroke or brain injury near Broca's area that can isolate Broca's area from other areas of the brain. People with TMA typically have good repetition skills, but struggle with spontaneous speech and rather producing speech with a lot of abrupt starts and stops. Other symptoms of TMA include difficulty with word-finding, sentence structure, intonation and rhythm, writing, and initiating speech.

=== Conduction aphasia ===
Conduction aphasia is a mild expressive language disorder characterized by the inability to repeat words or phrases, defective use of phonemes, and impaired naming ability. Patients with conduction aphasia struggle to may also have mild impairments with spoken language, such as paraphasias (word and sound substitutions) and difficulty finding the appropriate word. They can usually read, write, speak, and understand spoken messages with little difficulty.

=== Mixed transcortical aphasia ===
Mixed transcortical aphasia (MTA) is a rare, but more severe form of global aphasia. This language disorder is characterized by characterized by non-fluent language that lacks prosody, echolalia (repetition of what is said to them), difficulty creating spontaneous language, impaired reading and writing, and difficulties with language comprehension. Patients with MTA typically respond only when prompted and verbal output may be limited to repetition of examiner prompts. Mixed Transcortical Aphasia has also been called isolation aphasia, as it is caused by damage to the brain that isolates Broca's area and Wernicke's area from the rest of the brain.

=== Primary progressive aphasia ===
Primary progressive aphasia (PPA) is a relatively rare neurological syndrome caused by neurodegenerative diseases such as dementia, Alzheimer's, and frontotemporal lobar degradation. This means that symptoms will get worse over time. The symptoms of PPA vary depending on which areas of the brain have been affected, and can include non-fluent speech, language comprehension deficits, and the inability to read and write. There are three types of PPA. Semantic PPA involves a difficulty with naming familiar items and comprehending the meaning of individual words. Agrammatic / nonfluent PPA is characterized by a reduced amount of speech output and difficulty pronouncing words. Patients with agrammatic PPA often present with slower and halting speech, and issues with sentence structure and grammar. Logopenic PPA is a difficulty with repeating spoken language and finding words, such as recalling the names of objects and thinking of the right word in conversation.

== Treatment ==
The goal of language interventions are to correct overall language development and teach language skills with the aim of enhancing everyday communication and access to education. The objectives of treatment are based on the type and severity of the disorder. The strengths-based approach can be especially effective for individual's with co-occurring developmental or learning disorders. This approach affirms neurodiversity by identifying individual strengths, presuming competence, allowing autonomic decision making, and focusing on environmental supports.

=== Early intervention (From birth to three years) ===
A primary goal of early intervention is to promote caregiver responsiveness to the child and their efforts to communicate. This is based on a large body of research showing that children exposed to responsive conversation talk show better rates of language development.

=== Preschool intervention ===
By three years of age, most children are entering preschool and should be able to sit and listen for short intervals, participate in group activities, and follow instructions from an adult. If these developmental milestones are not met, therapists aim to close the gap by promoting growth in implicit language knowledge across a range of communication skills. This can be achieved by increasing the child's language experience (more trials in a learning task leads to better learning), and increasing emphasis on or control over the placement of the language target to enhance the salience of their language. There is scientific evidence supporting various speech and language therapy strategies for improving language skills in people with developmental language disorder. (Note: Attributed to multiple sources:) Family-centered care, where caregivers primarily carry out the intervention within daily routines and interactions, is often effective for children with DLD. For example, parent training can be effective in improving outcomes for young children with developmental language disorder.

=== Intervention for school-age children ===
Language demands increase substantially as children move farther from home and deeper into the school setting, where language and communication skills facilitate the learning process.

== See also ==
- Autism
- Aphasia
- Broca's area
- Wernicke's area
- Communication disorder
- Dyslexia
- Speech–language pathology
- Specific language impairment
- Hearing loss
