= Paraphasia =

Speech difficulty associated with aphasia

Paraphasia is a type of language output error commonly associated with aphasia and characterized by the production of unintended syllables, words, or phrases during the effort to speak. Paraphasic errors are most common in patients with fluent forms of aphasia, and come in three forms: phonemic or literal, neologistic, and verbal. Paraphasias can affect metrical information, segmental information, number of syllables, or both. Some paraphasias preserve the meter without segmentation, and some do the opposite. However, most paraphasias partially have both affects.

The term was apparently introduced in 1877 by the German-English physician Julius Althaus in his book on Diseases of the Nervous System, in a sentence reading, "In some cases there is a perfect chorea or delirium of words, which may be called paraphasia".

== Causes ==
Paraphasia is associated with fluent aphasias, characterized by "fluent spontaneous speech, long grammatically shaped sentences and preserved prosody abilities." Examples of these fluent aphasias include receptive or Wernicke's aphasia, anomic aphasia, conduction aphasia, and transcortical sensory aphasia, among others. All of these lead to a difference in processing efficiency, which is often caused by damage to a cortical region in the brain (in receptive aphasia, for example, the lesion is in or near Wernicke's area); lesion location is the most important determining factor for all aphasic disorders, including paraphasia – the location of the lesion can be used to hypothesize the type of aphasic symptoms the patient will display. This lesion can be caused by a variety of different methods: malfunctioning blood vessels (caused, for example, by a stroke) in the brain are the cause of 80% of aphasias in adults, as compared to head injuries, dementia and degenerative diseases, poisoning, metabolic disorders, infectious diseases, and demyelinating diseases. Lesions involving the posterior superior temporal lobe are often associated with fluent aphasias.

=== Damage to the brain's language centers ===
Two areas of the brain, Broca's area and Wernicke's area, are responsible for various disruptions in speech when damaged. Each is defined by their distinct characteristics. Broca's aphasia is characterized by non-fluent or telegraphic-type speech - where articles, conjunctions, prepositions, auxiliary verbs, pronouns and morphological inflections (plurals, past tense) are omitted. The word substitutions are infrequent and distortion of consonants and simplification of consonant clusters is frequent. Content words such as nouns, verbs and adjectives may be preserved. Subjects of this aphasia are aware of their errors in speech. Damage to the Broca's area does not affect comprehension of speech.

Wernicke's aphasia is characterized by fluent language with made up or unnecessary words with little or no meaning to speech. Those who suffer from this type of aphasia have difficulty understanding others' speech and are unaware of their own mistakes. When corrected they will repeat their verbal paraphasias and have trouble finding the correct word. Wernicke's area is found in the dominant hemisphere of the posterior gyrus of the first temporal convolution of the brain, whereas Broca's area is found anterior to the Wernicke's area.

== Symptoms ==
=== Phonemic paraphasia ===
Phonemic paraphasia, also referred to as phonological paraphasia or literal paraphasia, refers to the substitution of a word with a nonword that preserves at least half of the segments and/or number of syllables of the intended word. This can lead to a variety of errors, including formal ones, in which one word is replaced with another phonologically related to the intended word; phonemic ones, in which one word is replaced with a nonword phonologically related to the intended word; and approximations, an attempt to find the word without producing either a word or nonword. These types of errors are associated with Wernicke's aphasia, among others. Phonemic paraphasias are often caused by lesions to the external capsule, extending to the posterior part of the temporal lobe or internal capsule. This type of paraphasia also occurs in other languages as well. For example, case studies have been performed with German speakers, which demonstrated that 30.8% of paraphasias occurred at the beginning of the word in patients with Wernicke's aphasia and 22.6% for patients with Broca's aphasia. In English speakers this tendency to create errors at the beginning of the word remained.

Types of phonemic paraphasias
Type	Description	Example
Anticipatory error	Occurs when a segment from later in the word replaces a segment from earlier in the word	"papple" for apple "lelephone" for telephone
Perseverative error	Occurs when a segment from earlier in the word replaces a segment from later in the word	"gingerjed" for gingerbread
Paradigmatic error	Based on similarity in how the sounds are formed	"marmer" for barber
Addition error	A segment is added that bears no relation to the intended word. Addition errors are much rarer than anticipatory, perseverative, or paradigmatic errors, though they do occur. Anticipatory errors from words surrounding the intended one can most often be mistaken for addition errors.	"selezant" for elephant (possibly)
Substitution error	Involves a clear phonological substitution	"ragon" for wagon
Epenthetic error	Insertion of a segment into the target	"plants" for pants
Metathetical error	Full exchange of segments	"deks" for desk

=== Neologistic paraphasia ===
Neologistic paraphasias, a substitution with a non-English or gibberish word, follow pauses indicating word-finding difficulty. They can affect any part of speech, and the previously mentioned pause can be used to indicate the relative severity of the neologism; less severe neologistic paraphasias can be recognized as a distortion of a real word, and more severe ones cannot. The hypothesized source for these neologisms is “a device which quasirandomly combines English phonemes in a phonotactically regular way.” A neologistic paraphasia can be thought of as a neologism resulting from aphasia, rather than any other of the sources with which they are associated. Neologistic paraphasia is often associated with receptive aphasia and jargon aphasia.

There are various types of neologistic paraphasias. They can be phonologically related to a prior word, a following word, the intended word, or another neologism. The neologistic paraphasia shares phonemes or the position of phonemes with the related word. This most often occurs when the word and neologistic paraphasia are in the same clause. Neologistic paraphasias have a less stringent relationship with the target word than phonological paraphasias – where a phonological paraphasia has more than half of the target word’s phonemes, a neologistic paraphasia has less than half.

=== Verbal paraphasia ===
Verbal paraphasias are confusions of words or the replacement of one word by another real word; another definition is that of a contextually inappropriate English word or an English word of a syntactically incorrect class – the wrong part of speech, for example. Verbal paraphasias do not often preserve length, although the gender of the target word was preserved in more than half of the errors in one case study. It is hypothesized that verbal paraphasias are not the result of a random process but from a precise deficit in a single area. Verbal paraphasias are the only type of paraphasias that can also be linked to nonfluent aphasias, and they are mainly caused by lesions to the posterior temporal region of the brain, the head of the caudate nucleus, or both. These errors can be semantic, in which the meaning of the word is related to that of the intended word (car for van, for example). Semantic paraphasias can be further subdivided into six different types.

Types of semantic paraphasias
Type	Description	Examples
Coordinate	Replaces the target word with one that is from the same category	lion → tiger
Associate	Replaces the target word with one that is related to the target, but is not from the same category	foot → shoe
Superordinate	Replaces a specific target word with a more generalized group that the target word belongs to	pear → fruit
Subordinate	Replace the target word with one that is more specific	flower → rose
Part-whole	Replaces the "whole" with the "part"; or, conversely, the part with the whole	hand → finger foot → leg
Visual	Replaces the target word with a word that shares visual features with the target	nail → knife

Random errors, in which the word has no relation to the target, also occur.

=== Perseverative paraphasia ===
Perseverative paraphasia is a type of paraphasia in which the previous response persists and interferes with retrieval of new responses. (See the experimental case study D.L.A published by Dennis in 1976.) It is associated with lesions in the left caudate nucleus.

== Treatment ==
Many language impairments, including paraphasic errors, are reduced in number through spontaneous recovery of neurological function; this occurs most often with stroke patients within the first three months of recovery. Lesions associated with ischemic strokes have a shorter spontaneous recovery time, within the first two weeks; on the other hand, lesions associated with hemorrhagic strokes have a longer period for spontaneous recovery, from four to eight weeks. Whether spontaneous recovery occurs or not, treatment must begin immediately after the stroke, with support from a speech therapist or speech pathologist. A traditional approach requires treatment beginning at the level of breakdown – in the case of paraphasia, at the level of the phoneme. There are commercially available workbooks that provide various activities such as letter, word-picture, or word-word matching, and sentence completion, among other things. The difficulty of these activities varies with the level of treatment. However, these treatments have not been proven to be clinically productive.

A 1988 study by Mary Boyle proposed a method focused on oral reading to treat phonemic paraphasias, which was partially successful, resulting in fewer phonemic paraphasias but a slower rate of speech. Treatments lasted for 50 minutes and occurred once a week. During these treatment sessions, the patient was instructed to look at twenty different phrases, each consisting of one to three syllables, then read the phrase. If the patient failed to read the phrase, the process was repeated. If the patient failed to read the phrase again, the process was abandoned. To progress from a set of one syllable phrases to two syllable phrases and two syllable phrases to three syllable phrases, an 80% success rate was necessary. This treatment was partially successful. Although fewer phonemic paraphasias were produced due to this treatment, speaking efficiency was not improved by this study. This is partially because the focus of the treatment was on sound production rather than semantic content. Improvements lasted for six weeks before the patient regressed.

== Experimental (magnetic-stimulation-induced) paraphasias ==
Transient paraphasias (as well as other language defects such as speech arrest) can be generated by artificially activating the brain's language network with Transcranial magnetic stimulation (TMS). With navigated TMS (nTMS), nodes of the language network can be located presurgically so that critical areas can be saved when performing tumor or epilepsy surgery.

== See also ==
- Ganser syndrome
- Language disorder
- Lists of language disorders
- Malapropism
- Paragraphia, similar to paraphasia, but for written languages
- Speech disfluency
- Speech error
- Word salad, an unintelligible jumble of words

== Sources ==
- "Aphasia: Characteristics". The Neuroscience on the Web Series.
- "paraphasia - definition of paraphasia in the Medical dictionary - by the Free Online Medical Dictionary, Thesaurus and Encyclopedia".
- "I Can't Come Up with the Right Word..." by William Barr, Ph.D., ABPP
- Buckingham Hugh W., Rekart Deborah M. (1979). "Semantic paraphasia". Journal of Communication Disorders. 12 (3): 197–209. doi:10.1016/0021-9924(79)90041-8. PMID 438359.
- ScienceDaily - 'Weapons Of Mass Production', I Mean, 'Mass Destruction!' How The Brain Prevents Verbal Errors, Nov 5, 2008
- Science Daily - Area Of Brain Key To Choosing Words Identified, Dec 30, 2008
