= Transcortical sensory aphasia =

Damage to the brain's temporal lobe

Transcortical sensory aphasia (TSA) is a kind of aphasia that involves damage to specific areas of the temporal lobe of the brain, resulting in symptoms such as poor auditory comprehension, relatively intact repetition, and fluent speech with semantic paraphasias present. TSA is a fluent aphasia similar to Wernicke's aphasia (receptive aphasia), with the exception of a strong ability to repeat words and phrases. The person may repeat questions rather than answer them ("echolalia").

In all of these ways, TSA is very similar to a more commonly known language disorder, receptive aphasia. However, transcortical sensory aphasia differs from receptive aphasia in that patients still have intact repetition and exhibit echolalia, or the compulsive repetition of words. Transcortical sensory aphasia cannot be diagnosed through brain imaging techniques such as functional magnetic resonance imaging (fMRI), as the results are often difficult to interpret. Therefore, clinicians rely on language assessments and observations to determine if a patient presents with the characteristics of TSA. Patients diagnosed with TSA have shown partial recovery of speech and comprehension after beginning speech therapy. Speech therapy methods for patients with any subtype of aphasia are based on the principles of learning and neuroplasticity. Clinical research on TSA is limited because it occurs so infrequently in patients with aphasia that it is very difficult to perform systematic studies.

TSA should not be confused with transcortical motor aphasia (TMA), which is characterized by nonfluent speech output, with good comprehension and repetition. Patients with TMA have impaired writing skills, difficulty speaking and difficulty maintaining a clear thought process. Furthermore, TMA is caused by lesions in cortical motor areas of the brain as well as lesions in the anterior portion of the basal ganglia, and can be seen in patients with expressive aphasia.

== Affected brain areas ==
Damage to the inferior left temporal lobe, which is shown in green, is associated with TSA.

Transcortical sensory aphasia is caused by lesions in the inferior left temporal lobe of the brain located near Wernicke's area, and is usually due to minor hemorrhage or contusion in the temporal lobe, or infarcts of the left posterior cerebral artery (PCA). One function of the arcuate fasciculus is the connection between Wernicke’s and Broca’s area. In TSA Wernicke’s and Broca’s areas are spared, meaning that lesions do not occur in these regions of the brain. However, since the arcuate fasciculus, Wernicke's area, and Broca's area are secluded from the rest of the brain in TSA, patients still have intact repetition (as information from the arcuate fasciculus is relayed to Broca’s area), but cannot attach meaning to words, either spoken or heard.

== Characteristics ==
Transcortical sensory aphasia is characterized as a fluent aphasia. Fluency is determined by direct qualitative observation of the patient’s speech to determine the length of spoken phrases, and is usually characterized by a normal or rapid rate; normal phrase length, rhythm, melody, and articulatory agility; and normal or paragrammatic speech. Transcortical sensory aphasia is a disorder in which there is a discrepancy between phonological processing, which remains intact, and lexical-semantic processing, which is impaired. Therefore, patients can repeat complicated phrases, however they lack comprehension and propositional speech. This disconnect occurs since Wernicke’s area is not damaged in patients with TSA, therefore repetition is spared while comprehension is affected. Patients with intact repetition can repeat both simple and complex phrases spoken by others, e.g. when asked if the patient would like to go for a walk, he or she would respond "go for walk." Although patients can respond appropriately, due to the extent of their TSA, it is most likely that they do not comprehend what others ask them. In addition to problems in comprehension, transcortical sensory aphasia is further characterized based on deficits in naming and paraphasia.

=== Verbal comprehension ===
Impaired verbal comprehension can be the result a number of causes such as failure of speech sound discrimination, word recognition, auditory working memory, or syntactic structure building. When clinically examined, patients with TSA will exhibit poor comprehension of verbal commands. Based on the extent of the comprehension deficiency, patients will have difficulty following simple commands, e.g. “close your eyes.” Depending on the extent of affected brain area, patients are able to follow simple commands but may not be able to comprehend more difficult, multistep commands, e.g. “point to the ceiling, then touch your left ear with your right hand." Verbal commands as such, that require the patient to cross over the midline of their body are typically more taxing than commands that involve solely the right or left side. When increasing the complexity of verbal commands comprehension is often tested by varying the grammatical structure of the command to determine whether or not the patient understands different grammatical variations of the same sentence. Commands involving the passive voice or possessive, e.g. "If the snake killed the mouse, which one is still alive," usually result in comprehension problems in those who can understand simple questions.

=== Naming ===
Naming involves the ability to recall an object. Patients with TSA, as well as patients with all other aphasia subtypes, exhibit poor naming. Clinical assessment of naming involves the observer first asking the patient to name high frequency objects such as clock, door, and chair. TSA patients who name common objects with ease generally have difficulty naming both uncommon objects and specific parts of objects such as lapel, or the dial on a watch.

=== Paraphasia ===
Patients with TSA typically exhibit paraphasia; their speech is fluent but often error-prone. Their speech is often unintelligible as they tend to use the wrong words, e.g. tree instead of train or uses words in senseless and incorrect combinations.

== Diagnosis ==
=== Clinical assessment ===
Sensory aphasia is typically diagnosed by non-invasive evaluations. Neurologists, neuropsychologists or speech pathologists will administer oral evaluations to determine the extent of a patient’s comprehension and speech capability. Initial assessment will determine if the cause of linguistic deficiency is aphasia. If the diagnosis is then confirmed, testing will next address the type of aphasia and its severity. The Boston Diagnostic Aphasia Examination specializes in determining the severity of a sensory aphasia through the observation of conversational behaviors. Several modalities of perception and response are observed in conjunction with the subject’s ability to process sensory information. The location of the brain lesion and type of the aphasia can then be inferred from the observed symptoms. The Minnesota Test for Differential Diagnosis is the most lengthy and thorough assessment of sensory aphasia. It pinpoints weaknesses in the auditory and visual senses, as well as reading comprehension. From this differential diagnosis, a patient’s course of treatment can be determined. After treatment planning, the Porch Index of Communicative Ability is used to evaluate prognosis and the degree of recovery.

=== Imaging ===
fMRI is a measure of the increase in blood flow to localized areas of the brain that coincide with neural activity and is used to image brain activity related to a specific task or sensory process. It is a commonly used method for imaging brain activity in aphasia patients.

Sensory aphasia cannot be diagnosed through the use of imaging techniques. Differences in cognition between asymptomatic subjects and affected patients can be observed via functional magnetic resonance imaging (fMRI). However, these results only reveal temporal differences in cognition between control and diagnosed subjects. The degree of progression during therapy can also be surveyed through cognition tests monitored by fMRI. Many patients’ progress is assessed over time via repeated testing and corresponding cerebral imaging by fMRI.

== Management ==
Due to advances in modern neuroimaging, scientists have been able to gain a better understanding of how language is learned and comprehended. Based on the new data from the world of neuroscience, improvements can be made in coping with the disorder.

Therapists have been developing multiple methods of improving speech and comprehension. These techniques utilize three general principles: maximizing therapy occurrences, ensuring behavioral and communicative relevance, and allowing patients to focus on the language tools that are still available in his or her repertoire.

Many of the following treatment techniques are used to improve auditory comprehension in patients with aphasia:

- Using common words
- Using concrete nouns is more effective than using adjectives, adverbs, or verbs
- Using action verbs that are easily imagined
- Concise and grammatically simple sentences as opposed to lengthy sentences
- Speaking slowly, repeating oneself several times when conversing with aphasic patients
- Using gestures

A relatively new method of language therapy involves coincidence learning. Coincidence learning focuses on the simultaneous learning of two or more events and stipulates that these events are wired together in the brain, strengthening the learning process. Therapists use coincidence learning to find and improve language correlations or coincidences that have been either damaged or deleted by severe cases of aphasia, such as transcortical sensory aphasia. This technique is important in brain function and recovery, as it strengthens associated brain areas that remain unaffected after brain damage. It can be achieved with intensive therapy hours in order to maximize time where correlation is emphasized.

Through careful analysis of neuroimaging studies, a correlation has been developed with motor function and the understanding of action verbs. For example, leg and motor areas were seen to be activated words such as "kick", leading scientists to understand the connection between motor and language processes in the brain. This is yet another example of using relationships that are related in the brain for the purpose of rehabilitating speech and comprehension.

Of huge importance in aphasia therapy is the need to start practicing as soon as possible. Greater recovery occurs when a patient attempts to improve their comprehension and speaking soon after aphasia occurs. There is an inverse relationship between the length of time spent not practicing and level of recovery. The patient should be pushed to their limits of verbal communication in order for them to practice and build upon their remaining language skills.

One effective therapy technique is using what are known as language games in order to encourage verbal communication. One famous example is known as "Builder's Game", where a 'builder' and a 'helper' must communicate in order to effectively work on a project. The helper must hand the builder the tools he or she may need, which requires effective oral communication. The builder succeeds by requesting tools from the assistant by usually using single word utterances, such as 'hammer' or 'nail'. Thus, when the helper hands the tool to the builder, the game incorporates action with language, a key therapy technique. The assistant would then hand the builder the requested tool. Success of the game occurs when the builder's requests are specific to ensure successful building.

Ultimately, regardless of therapy plan or method, improvement in speech does not appear overnight; it requires a significant time investment by the patient as well as a dedicated speech therapist seeking to ensure that the patient is focusing on the correct speech tasks outside of the clinic. Furthermore, the patient must collaborate with friends and family members during their free time in order to maximize the efficacy of the treatment.

== See also ==
- Anomic aphasia
- Conduction aphasia
- Global aphasia
- Primary progressive aphasias
- Transcortical motor aphasia
- Broca's area
- Wernicke's area
