= Dynamic aphasia =

Language disorder

- Specialty: Neurology, Psychiatry

Dynamic aphasia is a type of aphasia characterized by difficulty or inability to produce spontaneous speech. Despite this, patients usually retain the ability to name objects, understand speech, and form sentences with proper grammar. It is considered a type of transcortical motor aphasia.

== Signs and symptoms ==
Spontaneous production of propositional speech in dynamic aphasia is seriously impaired. Patients will not usually spontaneously initiate conversation. However, they will initiate other activities, which distinguishes dynamic aphasia from apathy. They are also able to answer questions with constrained answers and participate in conversation with substantial external support.

Diagnosis of dynamic aphasia is based on cognitive testing such as the Hayling Sentence Completion Test. Word retrieval, spelling, grammar, word repetition, and comprehension of language are typically preserved.

== Causes ==
Damage to the left frontal lobe is typically implicated in dynamic aphasia. In addition, there may be a subset of more severely impaired dynamic aphasia patients with bilateral frontal lobe damage coupled with extreme difficulty in producing novel thoughts.

The frontal lobe damage that causes dynamic aphasia is most commonly due to a stroke, but can also be due to progressive supranuclear palsy or frontotemporal dementia. The progranulin gene is implicated in frontotemporal dementia with dynamic aphasia.

Rarely, cases may involve damage to the thalamus rather than the frontal lobe.

== See also ==
- Expressive aphasia
