= Transcortical motor aphasia =

Type of aphasia

Transcortical motor aphasia (TMoA), also known as commissural dysphasia or white matter dysphasia, results from damage in the anterior superior frontal lobe of the language-dominant hemisphere. This damage is typically due to cerebrovascular accident (CVA). TMoA is generally characterized by reduced speech output, which is a result of dysfunction of the affected region of the brain. The left hemisphere is usually responsible for performing language functions, although left-handed individuals have been shown to perform language functions using either their left or right hemisphere depending on the individual. The anterior frontal lobes of the language-dominant hemisphere are essential for initiating and maintaining speech. Because of this, individuals with TMoA often present with difficulty in speech maintenance and initiation.

Damage in the watershed region does not directly harm the areas of the brain involved in language production or comprehension; instead, the damage isolates these areas from the rest of the brain. If there is damage to the frontal lobe, executive functions related to language use are often affected. Executive functions relevant to language include activating language responses, controlling syntax (grammar), and narrative discourse. Difficulties in these areas can lead to supplementary deficits involving difficulties forming complex sentences, choosing which words to use appropriately, and initiating speech in conversation.

The extent and location of the brain damage will impact the degree and variety of language functioning characteristics (i.e. damage deep to the frontal lobe and/or damage across multiple regions will greatly impair language). Right hemiparesis, or right-sided paralysis, may coincide with TMoA if the lesion in the anterior frontal lobe is large enough and extends into the posterior frontal lobe.

There are some other forms of aphasia that relate to TMoA. For instance, adynamic aphasia is a form of TMoA that is characterized by sparse speech. This occurs as a result of executive functioning in the frontal lobe. Another form of aphasia related to TMoA is dynamic aphasia. Patients with this form of aphasia may present with a contiguity disorder in which they have difficulty combining linguistic elements. For dynamic aphasia, this is most apparent when the patient is asked to sequence at the sentence level whereas for other aphasias contiguity disorder can be seen at the phoneme or word level.

== Symptoms and signs ==
TMoA is classified as a non-fluent aphasia that is characterized by a significantly reduced output of speech, but good auditory comprehension. Auditory comprehension skills remain intact because the arcuate fasciculus and Wernicke's area are not impaired. Individuals with TMoA also exhibit good repetition skills and can repeat long, complex phrases effortlessly and without error. However, spontaneous speech often presents with paraphasias (a wide category of speech errors that are caused by aphasia). Regardless of any relative communication strengths, individuals with TMoA are typically poor conversational partners. Due to damage in the anterior superior frontal lobe, people with TMoA have deficits in initiation and maintenance of conversations, which results in reduced speech output. A person with TMoA may seldom produce utterances and typically remain silent. The utterances that they do produce are typically only one to two words long. However, in more structured and predictable interactions, individuals with TMoA tend to respond more fluently and promptly. In addition, these individuals are characterized by their attentiveness and cooperation and are often described as being task-oriented.

== Causes ==
Neurological imaging has shown that TMoA is typically caused by an infarct of the anterior superior frontal lobe in the perisylvian area of the left, or language-dominant, hemisphere. The anterior superior frontal lobe is known as the prefrontal cortex which is responsible for the initiation and ideation of verbal speech. The damage leaves the major language networks, Broca's and Wernicke’s areas and the arcuate fasciculus, unaffected. Brain injury can result from a stroke caused by left anterior cerebral artery (ACA) occlusion, brain tumors, traumatic brain injury (TBI), or progressive neurological disorders.

== Diagnosis ==
TMoA is diagnosed by the referring physician and speech-language pathologist (SLP). The overall sign of TMoA is nonfluent, reduced, fragmentary echoic, and perseverative speech with frequent hesitations and pauses. Patients with TMoA also have difficulty initiating and maintaining speech. However, speech articulation and auditory comprehension remain typical. The hallmark sign of TMoA is intact repetition in the presence of these signs and symptoms.

TMoA, or any other type of aphasia, is identified and diagnosed through the screening and assessment process. Screening can be conducted by an SLP or other professional when there is a suspected aphasia. The screening does not diagnose aphasia, rather it points to the need for a further comprehensive assessment. A screening typically includes evaluation of oral motor functions, speech production skills, comprehension, use of written and verbal language, cognitive communication, swallowing, and hearing. Both the screening and assessment must be sensitive to the patient's linguistic and cultural differences. An individual will be recommended to receive a comprehensive assessment if their screening shows signs of aphasia. Under the American Speech-Language-Hearing Association (ASHA) and World Health Organization (WHO) guidelines and the International Classification of Functioning, Disability and Health (ICF) framework, the comprehensive assessment encompasses not only speech and language, but also impairments in body structure and function, co-morbid deficits, limitations in activity and participation, and contextual (environmental and personal) factors. The assessment can be static (current functioning) or dynamic (ongoing) and the assessment tools can be standardized or nonstandardized. Typically, the assessment for aphasia includes a gathering of a case history, a self-report from the patient, an oral-motor examination, assessment of expressive and receptive language in spoken and written forms, and identification of facilitators and barriers to patient success. From this assessment, the SLP will determine type of aphasia and the patient's communicative strengths and weaknesses and how their diagnosis may impact their overall quality of life.

== Treatment ==
Treatment for all types of aphasia, including transcortical motor aphasia, is usually provided by a speech-language pathologist. The SLP chooses specific therapy tasks and goals based on the speech and language abilities and needs of the individual. In general for individuals with TMoA, treatment should capitalize on their strong auditory comprehension and repetition skills and address the individual's reduced speech output and difficulty initiating and maintaining a conversation. New research in aphasia treatment is showing the benefit of the Life Participation Approach to Aphasia (LPAA) in which goals are written based on the skills needed by the individual patient to participate in specific real-life situations (i.e. communicating effectively with nurses or gaining employment). Based on the specific needs of the patient, SLPs can provide a variety of treatment activities.

To improve word retrieval and initiation difficulties, clinicians may use confrontation naming in which the patient is asked to name various objects and pictures. Depending on the severity, they may also use sentence completion tasks in which the clinician says sentences with the final word(s) missing and expects the patient to fill in the blank. Limited research suggests that nonsymbolic limb movement on the left side (i.e. tapping the left hand on the table) during sentence production can increase verbal initiations. The use of the left arm in left space stimulates initiation mechanisms in the right hemisphere of the brain which can also be used for language allowing individuals to produce more grammatical sentences with higher fluency and more verbal initiation.

To increase speech output, the clinician may provide a set of pictures and prompt the patient to describe or elaborate on the events pictured. The clinician can also provide spoken or written words and prompt the patient to use the words in a sentence. Additionally, the clinician can ask questions based on the patient's experiences, opinions, or general knowledge and prompt the patient to answer with phrases or sentences. To work on more connected speech, the clinician may ask the patient to describe procedures such as making a sandwich or doing laundry. A study found that syntax training in which sentence constructions are elicited on a hierarchy of difficulty produced gains in grammatically complete utterances and utterances that successfully communicated novel and accurate information.

To improve conversational skills, SLPs may engage the patient in structured conversations in which supports are provided to help the patient take appropriate conversational turns, maintain the topic of conversation, and formulate appropriate sentences. Clinicians often need to provide pragmatic guidelines so that the patient's responses go beyond the clinician's request and so the clinician does not do the majority of the talking. Research shows that conversation therapy can improve percent of complex utterances, the efficiency of the utterances for expressing ideas, and total time spent talking over more traditional stimulation therapy.

In order to improve the patient's abilities to functionally communicate in their natural settings, the SLP will provide strategies and techniques to enhance their success in communicative settings (i.e. supplementing speech with nonverbal communication). Research supports the use of reduced syntax therapy to help patients overcome the non-fluent speech and agrammatism that often occurs with TMoA. Because agrammatism inhibits the patient's ability to form grammatically correct sentences, this type of treatment involves reducing these agrammatic deficits and teaching the patient to simplify linguistic structures while still conveying the message in order for language used to be more productive in conversation.

Additionally, they may train the patient's communication partners to support the conversational abilities of the patient by facilitating the use of preserved cognitive and social functions. Research supports the use of various partner training programs such as Supported Conversation for Adults with Aphasia from the Aphasia Institute. In this program, the focus is put on acknowledging the patient's competence and helping them to reveal that competence. Strategies include saying “I know you know” when appropriate, using gestures to supplement messages, limiting background noise, and given sufficient time for response.

From a neuroscience perspective, research has found that a dopamine agonist, bromocriptine, taken by mouth, has provided positive outcomes during intervention for non-fluent types of aphasia, such as TMoA or adynamic aphasia. Studies have found that bromocriptine increased neural networks which assist with the initiation of speech in individuals who possess non-fluent characteristics of speech.

In order to capitalize on neuroplasticity for treatment of all types of aphasia, timing, intensity, duration, and repetition of treatment should be taken into consideration. Research has found that aphasia treatment initiated during the earlier acute post-injury phase is more effective compared to treatment initiated in the chronic phase. With regard to intensity and duration of treatment, studies reported maximum recovery occurred with intense weekly therapy (approximately 8 hours per week) was delivered over a 2–3 month period. Other research shows that distributed therapy may be more beneficial than high intensity therapy. More research is needed to determine which is best, but it may be found that the ideal duration and intensity of therapy is variable depending on the patient and their needs.

== Prognosis ==
In relation to other types of aphasia, TMoA occurs less frequently, so there is less information on its prognosis. In general, for individuals with aphasia, most recovery is seen within 6 months of the stroke or injury although more recovery may continue in the following months or years. The timeline of recovery may look different depending on the type of stroke that caused the aphasia. With an ischemic stroke, recovery is greatest within the first two weeks and then diminishes overtime until the progress stabilizes. With a hemorrhagic stroke, the patient often shows little improvement in the first few weeks and then has relatively rapid recovery until they stabilize.

In a study involving eight patients with border zone lesions, all patients presented with transcortical mixed aphasia initially after the stroke. Three of these patients made a complete recovery within a few days post-stroke. For three other patients with more anterior lesions, their aphasia transitioned to TMoA. All participants in the study regained full language abilities within 18 months following their stroke. This suggests a positive long-term prognosis for patients with TMoA. However, this might not be the case for all patients and more research is needed in order to solidify these findings. Another study found that prognosis of TMoA is affected by lesion size. Smaller lesions typically cause delays in speech initiation; whereas, larger lesions lead to more profound language abnormalities and difficulty with abstract language abilities.

Research has shown that treatment has a direct effect on aphasia outcomes. Intensity, duration and timing of treatment all need to be taken in to consideration when choosing a course of treatment and determining a prognosis. In general, greater intensity leads to greater improvement. For duration, longer-term treatment produces more permanent changes. As for timing, beginning treatment too early may be difficult for the system which has not recovered enough to do intensive therapy, but beginning too late may result missing the window of the opportunity in which the most change can occur. Neuroplasticity, the brain's natural ability to reorganize itself following a traumatic event, occurs best when treatment connects simultaneous events, maintains attention, taps into positive emotion, utilizes repetition tasks, and is specific to the individual's needs.

Other factors affecting prognosis includes location and site of lesion. Since the lesion that results in TMoA usually occurs in the watershed area and does not directly involve the areas of the brain responsible for general language abilities, prognosis for these patients is good overall. Other factors that determine a patient's prognosis include age, education prior to the stroke, gender, motivation, and support.

== See also ==
- Transcortical sensory aphasia
