= Expressive aphasia =

Language disorder involving inability to produce language

- Other names: Broca's aphasia, non-fluent aphasia, agrammatic aphasia
- Broca and Wernicke are two areas involved in language formation.
- Specialty: Neurology, Psychiatry

Expressive aphasia (also known as Broca's aphasia) is a type of aphasia characterized by partial loss of the ability to produce language (spoken, manual, or written), although comprehension generally remains intact. A person with expressive aphasia will exhibit effortful speech. Speech generally includes important content words but leaves out function words that have more grammatical significance than physical meaning, such as prepositions and articles. This is known as "telegraphic speech". The person's intended message may still be understood, but their sentence will not be grammatically correct. In very severe forms of expressive aphasia, a person may only speak using single word utterances. Typically, comprehension is mildly to moderately impaired in expressive aphasia due to difficulty understanding complex grammar. A better way to describe aphasia is fluent or non-fluent rather than "expressive" or "receptive" given the typical presence of both expressive and receptive language deficits in all subtypes of aphasia.

It is caused by acquired damage to the frontal regions of the brain, such as Broca's area. Expressive aphasia contrasts with receptive aphasia, in which patients are able to speak in grammatical sentences that lack semantic significance and generally also have trouble with comprehension. Expressive aphasia differs from dysarthria, which is typified by a patient's inability to properly move the muscles of the tongue and mouth to produce speech. Expressive aphasia also differs from apraxia of speech, which is a motor disorder characterized by an inability to create and sequence motor plans for conscious speech.

== Signs and symptoms ==
Broca's (expressive) aphasia is a type of non-fluent aphasia in which an individual's speech is halting and effortful. Misarticulations or distortions of consonants and vowels, namely phonetic dissolution, are common. Individuals with expressive aphasia may only produce single words, or words in groups of two or three. Long pauses between words are common and multi-syllabic words may be produced one syllable at a time with pauses between each syllable. The prosody of a person with Broca's aphasia is compromised by shortened length of utterances and the presence of self-repairs and disfluencies. Intonation and stress patterns are also deficient.

For example, in the following passage, a patient with Broca's aphasia is trying to explain how he came to the hospital for dental surgery:

Yes... ah... Monday... er... Dad and Peter H... (his own name), and Dad.... er... hospital... and ah... Wednesday... Wednesday, nine o'clock... and oh... Thursday... ten o'clock, ah doctors... two... an' doctors... and er... teeth... yah.

The speech of a person with expressive aphasia contains mostly content words such as nouns, verbs, and some adjectives. However, function words like conjunctions, articles, and prepositions are rarely used except for "and" which is prevalent in the speech of most patients with aphasia. The omission of function words makes the person's speech agrammatic. A communication partner of a person with aphasia may say that the person's speech sounds telegraphic due to poor sentence construction and disjointed words. For example, a person with expressive aphasia might say "Smart... university... smart... good... good..."

Self-monitoring is typically well preserved in patients with Broca's aphasia. They are usually aware of their communication deficits, and are more prone to depression and outbursts from frustration than are patients with other forms of aphasia.

In general, word comprehension is preserved, allowing patients to have functional receptive language skills. Individuals with Broca's aphasia understand most of the everyday conversation around them, but higher-level deficits in receptive language can occur. Because comprehension is substantially impaired for more complex sentences, it is better to use simple language when speaking with an individual with expressive aphasia. This is exemplified by the difficulty to understand phrases or sentences with unusual structure. A typical patient with Broca's aphasia will misinterpret "the man is bitten by the dog" by switching the subject and object to "the dog is bitten by the man."

Typically, people with expressive aphasia can understand speech and read better than they can produce speech and write. The person's writing will resemble their speech and will be effortful, lacking cohesion, and containing mostly content words. Letters will likely be formed clumsily and distorted and some may even be omitted. Although listening and reading are generally intact, subtle deficits in both reading and listening comprehension are almost always present during assessment of aphasia.

Because Broca's area is anterior to the primary motor cortex, which is responsible for movement of the face, hands, and arms, a lesion affecting Broca's areas may also result in hemiparesis (weakness of both limbs on the same side of the body) or hemiplegia (paralysis of both limbs on the same side of the body). The brain is wired contralaterally, which means the limbs on right side of the body are controlled by the left hemisphere and vice versa. Therefore, when Broca's area or surrounding areas in the left hemisphere are damaged, hemiplegia or hemiparesis often occurs on the right side of the body in individuals with Broca's aphasia.

Severity of expressive aphasia varies among patients. Some people may only have mild deficits and detecting problems with their language may be difficult. In the most extreme cases, patients may be able to produce only a single word. Even in such cases, over-learned and rote-learned speech patterns may be retained – for instance, some patients can count from one to ten, but cannot produce the same numbers in novel conversation.

=== Manual language and aphasia ===
In deaf patients who use manual language (such as American Sign Language), damage to the left hemisphere of the brain leads to disruptions in their signing ability. Paraphasic errors similar to spoken language have been observed; whereas in spoken language a phonemic substitution would occur (e.g. "tagle" instead of "table"), in ASL case studies errors in movement, hand position, and morphology have been noted. Agrammatism, or the lack of grammatical morphemes in sentence production, has also been observed in lifelong users of ASL who have left hemisphere damage. The lack of syntactic accuracy shows that the errors in signing are not due to damage to the motor cortex, but rather area manifestation of the damage to the language-producing area of the brain. Similar symptoms have been seen in a patient with left hemisphere damage whose first language was British Sign Language, further showing that damage to the left hemisphere primarily hinders linguistic ability, not motor ability. In contrast, patients who have damage to non-linguistic areas on the left hemisphere have been shown to be fluent in signing, but are unable to comprehend written language.

=== Overlap with receptive aphasia ===
In addition to difficulty expressing oneself, individuals with expressive aphasia are also noted to commonly have trouble with comprehension in certain linguistic areas. This agrammatism overlaps with receptive aphasia, but can be seen in patients who have expressive aphasia without being diagnosed as having receptive aphasia. The most well-noted of these are object-relative clauses, object Wh- questions, and topicalized structures (placing the topic at the beginning of the sentence). These three concepts all share phrasal movement, which can cause words to lose their thematic roles when they change order in the sentence. This is often not an issue for people without agrammatic aphasias, but many people with aphasia rely heavily on word order to understand roles that words play within the sentence.

== Causes ==
=== More common ===
- Stroke or brain anoxia.
- Brain tumor
- Brain trauma
  - seizure (more temporary, reversible aphasia)

=== Less common ===
- Autoimmune disease
- Paraneoplastic syndrome
- Micrometastasis
- neurodegenerative disorders
- Certain infections (e.g., Bartonella henselae)
- Metabolic disease (e.g., hyperosmolar hyperglycemic state)

==== Common causes ====
The most common cause of expressive aphasia is stroke. A stroke is caused by hypoperfusion (lack of oxygen) to an area of the brain, which is commonly caused by thrombosis or embolism. Some form of aphasia occurs in 34 to 38% of stroke patients. Expressive aphasia occurs in approximately 12% of new cases of aphasia caused by stroke.

In most cases, expressive aphasia is caused by a stroke in Broca's area or the surrounding vicinity. Broca's area is in the lower part of the premotor cortex in the language dominant hemisphere and is responsible for planning motor speech movements. However, cases of expressive aphasia have been seen in patients with strokes in other areas of the brain. Patients with classic symptoms of expressive aphasia in general have more acute brain lesions, whereas patients with larger, widespread lesions exhibit a variety of symptoms that may be classified as global aphasia or left unclassified.

Expressive aphasia can also be caused by trauma to the brain, tumor, cerebral hemorrhage and by extradural abscess.

Understanding lateralization of brain function is important for understanding which areas of the brain cause expressive aphasia when damaged. In the past, it has been believed that the area for language production differs between left and right-handed individuals. If this were true, damage to the homologous region of Broca's area in the right hemisphere should cause aphasia in a left-handed individual. More recent studies have shown that even left-handed individuals typically have language functions only in the left hemisphere. However, left-handed individuals are more likely to have a dominance of language in the right hemisphere.

==== Uncommon causes ====
Less common causes of expressive aphasia include primary autoimmune phenomenon and autoimmune phenomenon that are secondary to cancer (as a paraneoplastic syndrome) have been listed as the primary hypothesis for several cases of aphasia, especially when presenting with other psychiatric disturbances and focal neurological deficits. Many case reports exist describing paraneoplastic aphasia, and the reports that are specific tend to describe expressive aphasia. Although most cases attempt to exclude micro-metastasis, it is likely that some cases of paraneoplastic aphasia are actually extremely small metastasis to the vocal motor regions.

Neurodegenerative disorders may present with aphasia. Alzheimer's disease may present with either fluent aphasia or expressive aphasia. There are case reports of Creutzfeldt–Jakob disease presenting with expressive aphasia.

== Diagnosis ==
Expressive aphasia is classified as non-fluent aphasia, as opposed to fluent aphasia. Diagnosis is done on a case-by-case basis, as lesions often affect the surrounding cortex and deficits are highly variable among patients with aphasia.

A physician is typically the first person to recognize aphasia in a patient who is being treated for damage to the brain. Routine processes for determining the presence and location of lesion in the brain include magnetic resonance imaging (MRI) and computed tomography (CT) scans. The physician will complete a brief assessment of the patient's ability to understand and produce language. For further diagnostic testing, the physician will refer the patient to a speech-language pathologist, who will complete a comprehensive evaluation.

In order to diagnose a patient with Broca's aphasia, there are certain commonly used tests and procedures. The Western Aphasia Battery (WAB) classifies individuals based on their scores on the subtests; spontaneous speech, auditory comprehension, repetition, and naming. The Boston Diagnostic Aphasia Examination (BDAE) can inform users what specific type of aphasia they may have, infer the location of lesion, and assess current language abilities. The Porch Index of Communication Ability (PICA) can predict potential recovery outcomes of the patients with aphasia. Quality of life measurement is also an important assessment tool. Tests such as the Assessment for Living with Aphasia (ALA) and the Satisfaction with Life Scale (SWLS) allow for therapists to target skills that are important and meaningful for the individual. Aphasia Diagnostic Profile helps in evaluating different language modalities.

In addition to formal assessments, patient and family interviews are valid and important sources of information. The patient's previous hobbies, interests, personality, and occupation are all factors that will not only impact therapy but may motivate them throughout the recovery process. Patient interviews and observations allow professionals to learn the priorities of the patient and family and determine what the patient hopes to regain in therapy. Observations of the patient may also be beneficial to determine where to begin treatment. The current behaviors and interactions of the patient will provide the therapist with more insight about the client and their individual needs. Other information about the patient can be retrieved from medical records, patient referrals from physicians, and the nursing staff.

In non-speaking patients who use manual languages, diagnosis is often based on interviews from the patient's acquaintances, noting the differences in sign production pre- and post-damage to the brain. Many of these patients will also begin to rely on non-linguistic gestures to communicate, rather than signing since their language production is hindered.

== Treatment ==
Currently, there is no standard treatment for expressive aphasia. Most aphasia treatment is individualized based on a patient's condition and needs as assessed by a speech language pathologist. Patients go through a period of spontaneous recovery following brain injury in which they regain a great deal of language function.

In the months following injury or stroke, most patients receive traditional treatment for a few hours per day. Among other exercises, patients practice the repetition of words and phrases. Mechanisms are also taught in traditional treatment to compensate for lost language function such as drawing and using phrases that are easier to pronounce.

Emphasis is placed on establishing a basis for communication with family and caregivers in everyday life. Treatment is individualized based on the patient's own priorities, along with the family's input.

A patient may have the option of individual or group treatment. Although less common, group treatment has been shown to have advantageous outcomes. Some types of group treatments include family counseling, maintenance groups, support groups and treatment groups.

=== Augmentative and alternative communication ===
Augmentative and alternative communication (AAC) can be used to support or replace verbal communication for individuals with aphasia. This includes communication using tools such as memory books, drawing, photography, written language and speech-generating devices.

=== Melodic intonation therapy ===
Melodic intonation therapy was inspired by the observation that individuals with non-fluent aphasia sometimes can sing words or phrases that they normally cannot speak. "Melodic Intonation Therapy was begun as an attempt to use the intact melodic/prosodic processing skills of the right hemisphere in those with aphasia to help cue retrieval words and expressive language." It is believed that this is because singing capabilities are stored in the right hemisphere of the brain, which is likely to remain unaffected after a stroke in the left hemisphere. However, recent evidence demonstrates that the capability of individuals with aphasia to sing entire pieces of text may actually result from rhythmic features and the familiarity with the lyrics.

The goal of Melodic Intonation Therapy is to utilize singing to access the language-capable regions in the right hemisphere and use these regions to compensate for lost function in the left hemisphere. The natural musical component of speech was used to engage the patients' ability to produce phrases. A clinical study revealed that singing and rhythmic speech may be similarly effective in the treatment of non-fluent aphasia and apraxia of speech. Moreover, evidence from randomized controlled trials is still needed to confirm that Melodic Intonation Therapy is suitable to improve propositional utterances and speech intelligibility in individuals with (chronic) non-fluent aphasia and apraxia of speech.

Melodic Intonation Therapy appears to work particularly well in patients who have had a unilateral, left hemisphere stroke, show poor articulation, are non-fluent or have severely restricted speech output, have moderately preserved auditory comprehension, and show good motivation. MIT therapy on average lasts for 1.5 hours per day for five days per week. At the lowest level of therapy, simple words and phrases (such as "water" and "I love you") are broken down into a series of high- and low-pitch syllables. With increased treatment, longer phrases are taught and less support is provided by the therapist. Patients are taught to say phrases using the natural melodic component of speaking and continuous voicing is emphasized. The patient is also instructed to use the left hand to tap the syllables of the phrase while the phrases are spoken. Tapping is assumed to trigger the rhythmic component of speaking to utilize the right hemisphere.

FMRI studies have shown that Melodic Intonation Therapy (MIT) uses both sides of the brain to recover lost function, as opposed to traditional therapies that utilize only the left hemisphere. In MIT, individuals with small lesions in the left hemisphere seem to recover by activation of the left hemisphere perilesional cortex. Meanwhile, individuals with larger left-hemisphere lesions show a recruitment of the use of language-capable regions in the right hemisphere. The interpretation of these results is still a matter of debate. For example, it remains unclear whether changes in neural activity in the right hemisphere result from singing or from the intensive use of common phrases, such as "thank you", "how are you?" or "I am fine." This type of phrases falls into the category of formulaic language and is known to be supported by neural networks of the intact right hemisphere.

A pilot study reported positive results when comparing the efficacy of a modified form of MIT to no treatment in people with nonfluent aphasia with damage to their left-brain. A randomized controlled trial was conducted and the study reported benefits of utilizing modified MIT treatment early in the recovery phase for people with nonfluent aphasia.

Melodic Intonation Therapy is used by music therapists, board-certified professionals that use music as a therapeutic tool to effect certain non-musical outcomes in their patients. Speech language pathologists can also use this therapy for individuals who have had a left hemisphere stroke and non-fluent aphasias such as Broca's or even apraxia of speech. Its effectiveness has been show in many languages.

=== Constraint-induced therapy ===
Constraint-induced aphasia therapy (CIAT) is based on similar principles as constraint-induced movement therapy developed by Dr. Edward Taub at the University of Alabama at Birmingham. Constraint-induced movement therapy is based on the idea that a person with an impairment (physical or communicative) develops a "learned nonuse" by compensating for the lost function with other means such as using an unaffected limb by a paralyzed individual or drawing by a patient with aphasia. In constraint-induced movement therapy, the alternative limb is constrained with a glove or sling and the patient is forced to use the affected limb. In constraint-induced aphasia therapy the interaction is guided by communicative need in a language game context, picture cards, barriers making it impossible to see other players' cards, and other materials, so that patients are encouraged ("constrained") to use the remaining verbal abilities to succeed in the communication game.

Two important principles of constraint-induced aphasia therapy are that treatment is very intense, with sessions lasting for up to 6 hours over the course of 10 days and that language is used in a communication context in which it is closely linked to (nonverbal) actions. These principles are motivated by neuroscience insights about learning at the level of nerve cells (synaptic plasticity) and the coupling between cortical systems for language and action in the human brain. Constraint-induced therapy contrasts sharply with traditional therapy by the strong belief that mechanisms to compensate for lost language function, such as gesturing or writing, should not be used unless absolutely necessary, even in everyday life.

It is believed that CIAT works by the mechanism of increased neuroplasticity. By constraining an individual to use only speech, it is believed that the brain is more likely to reestablish old neural pathways and recruit new neural pathways to compensate for lost function.

The strongest results of CIAT have been seen in patients with chronic aphasia (lasting over 6 months). Studies of CIAT have confirmed that further improvement is possible even after a patient has reached a "plateau" period of recovery. It has also been proven that the benefits of CIAT are retained long term. However, improvements only seem to be made while a patient is undergoing intense therapy. Recent work has investigated combining constraint-induced aphasia therapy with drug treatment, which led to an amplification of therapy benefits.

=== Medication ===
In addition to active speech therapy, pharmaceuticals have also been considered as a useful treatment for expressive aphasia. This area of study is relatively new and much research continues to be conducted.

The following drugs have been suggested for use in treating aphasia and their efficacy has been studied in control studies.

- Bromocriptine – acts on catecholamine systems
- Piracetam – mechanism not fully understood, but most likely interacts with cholinergic and glutamatergic receptors, among others
- Cholinergic drugs (donepezil, aniracetam, bifemelane) – act on acetylcholine systems
- Dopaminergic psychostimulants (dexamphetamine, methylphenidate)

The most effect has been shown by piracetam and amphetamine, which may increase cerebral plasticity and result in an increased capability to improve language function. It has been seen that piracetam is most effective when treatment is begun immediately following stroke. When used in chronic cases it has been much less efficient.

Bromocriptine has been shown by some studies to increase verbal fluency and word retrieval with therapy than with just therapy alone. Furthermore, its use seems to be restricted to non-fluent aphasia.

Donepezil has shown a potential for helping chronic aphasia.

No study has established irrefutable evidence that any drug is an effective treatment for aphasia therapy. Furthermore, no study has shown any drug to be specific for language recovery. Comparison between the recovery of language function and other motor function using any drug has shown that improvement is due to a global increase plasticity of neural networks.

=== Transcranial magnetic stimulation ===
In transcranial magnetic stimulation (TMS), magnetic fields are used to create electrical currents in specified cortical regions. The procedure is a painless and noninvasive method of stimulating the cortex. TMS works by suppressing the inhibition process in certain areas of the brain. By suppressing the inhibition of neurons by external factors, the targeted area of the brain may be reactivated and thereby recruited to compensate for lost function. Research has shown that patients can demonstrate increased object naming ability with regular transcranial magnetic stimulation than patients not receiving TMS. Furthermore, research suggests this improvement is sustained upon the completion of TMS therapy. However, some patients fail to show any significant improvement from TMS which indicates the need for further research of this treatment.

=== Treatment of underlying forms ===
Described as the linguistic approach to the treatment of expressive aphasia, treatment begins by emphasizing and educating patients on the thematic roles of words within sentences. Sentences that are usually problematic will be reworded into active-voiced, declarative phrasings of their non-canonical counterparts. The simpler sentence phrasings are then transformed into variations that are more difficult to interpret. For example, many individuals who have expressive aphasia struggle with Wh- sentences. "What" and "who" questions are problematic sentences that this treatment method attempts to improve, and they are also two interrogative particles that are strongly related to each other because they reorder arguments from the declarative counterparts. For instance, therapists have used sentences like, "Who is the boy helping?" and "What is the boy fixing?" because both verbs are transitive- they require two arguments in the form of a subject and a direct object, but not necessarily an indirect object. In addition, certain question particles are linked together based on how the reworded sentence is formed. Training "who" sentences increased the generalizations of non-trained "who" sentences as well as untrained "what" sentences, and vice versa. Likewise, "where" and "when" question types are very closely linked. "What" and "who" questions alter placement of arguments, and "where" and "when" sentences move adjunct phrases. Training is in the style of: "The man parked the car in the driveway. What did the man park in the driveway?" Sentence training goes on in this manner for more domains, such as clefts and sentence voice.

Results: Patients' use of sentence types used in the TUF treatment will improve, subjects will generalize sentences of similar category to those used for treatment in TUF, and results are applied to real-world conversations with others. Generalization of sentence types used can be improved when the treatment progresses in the order of more complex sentences to more elementary sentences. Treatment has been shown to affect on-line (real-time) processing of trained sentences and these results can be tracked using fMRI mappings. Training of Wh- sentences has led improvements in three main areas of discourse for aphasics: increased average length of utterances, higher proportions of grammatical sentences, and larger ratios of numbers of verbs to nouns produced. Patients also showed improvements in verb argument structure productions and assigned thematic roles to words in utterances with more accuracy. In terms of on-line sentence processing, patients having undergone this treatment discriminate between anomalous and non-anomalous sentences with more accuracy than control groups and are closer to levels of normalcy than patients not having participated in this treatment.

=== Mechanisms of recovery ===
Mechanisms for recovery differ from patient to patient. Some mechanisms for recovery occur spontaneously after damage to the brain, whereas others are caused by the effects of language therapy. FMRI studies have shown that recovery can be partially attributed to the activation of tissue around the damaged area and the recruitment of new neurons in these areas to compensate for the lost function. Recovery may also be caused in very acute lesions by a return of blood flow and function to damaged tissue that has not died around an injured area. It has been stated by some researchers that the recruitment and recovery of neurons in the left hemisphere opposed to the recruitment of similar neurons in the right hemisphere is superior for long-term recovery and continued rehabilitation. It is thought that, because the right hemisphere is not intended for full language function, using the right hemisphere as a mechanism of recovery is effectively a "dead-end" and can lead only to partial recovery.

There is evidence to support that, among all types of therapies, one of the most important factors and best predictors for a successful outcome is the intensity of the therapy. By comparing the length and intensity of various methods of therapies, it was proven that intensity is a better predictor of recovery than the method of therapy used.

== Prognosis ==
In most individuals with expressive aphasia, the majority of recovery is seen within the first year following a stroke or injury. The majority of this improvement is seen in the first four weeks in therapy following a stroke and slows thereafter. However, this timeline will vary depending upon the type of stroke experienced by the patient. Patients who experienced an ischemic stroke may recover in the days and weeks following the stroke, and then experience a plateau and gradual slowing of recovery. On the contrary, patients who experienced a hemorrhagic stroke experience a slower recovery in the first 4–8 weeks, followed by a faster recovery which eventually stabilizes.

Numerous factors impact the recovery process and outcomes. Site and extent of lesion greatly impacts recovery. Other factors that may affect prognosis are age, education, gender, and motivation. Occupation, handedness, personality, and emotional state may also be associated with recovery outcomes.

Studies have also found that prognosis of expressive aphasia correlates strongly with the initial severity of impairment. However, it has been seen that continued recovery is possible years after a stroke with effective treatment. Timing and intensity of treatment is another factor that impacts outcomes. Research suggests that even in later stages of recovery, intervention is effective at improving function, as well as, preventing loss of function.

Unlike receptive aphasia, patients with expressive aphasia are aware of their errors in language production. This may further motivate a person with expressive aphasia to progress in treatment, which would affect treatment outcomes. On the other hand, awareness of impairment may lead to higher levels of frustration, depression, anxiety, or social withdrawal, which have been proven to negatively affect a person's chance of recovery.

== History ==
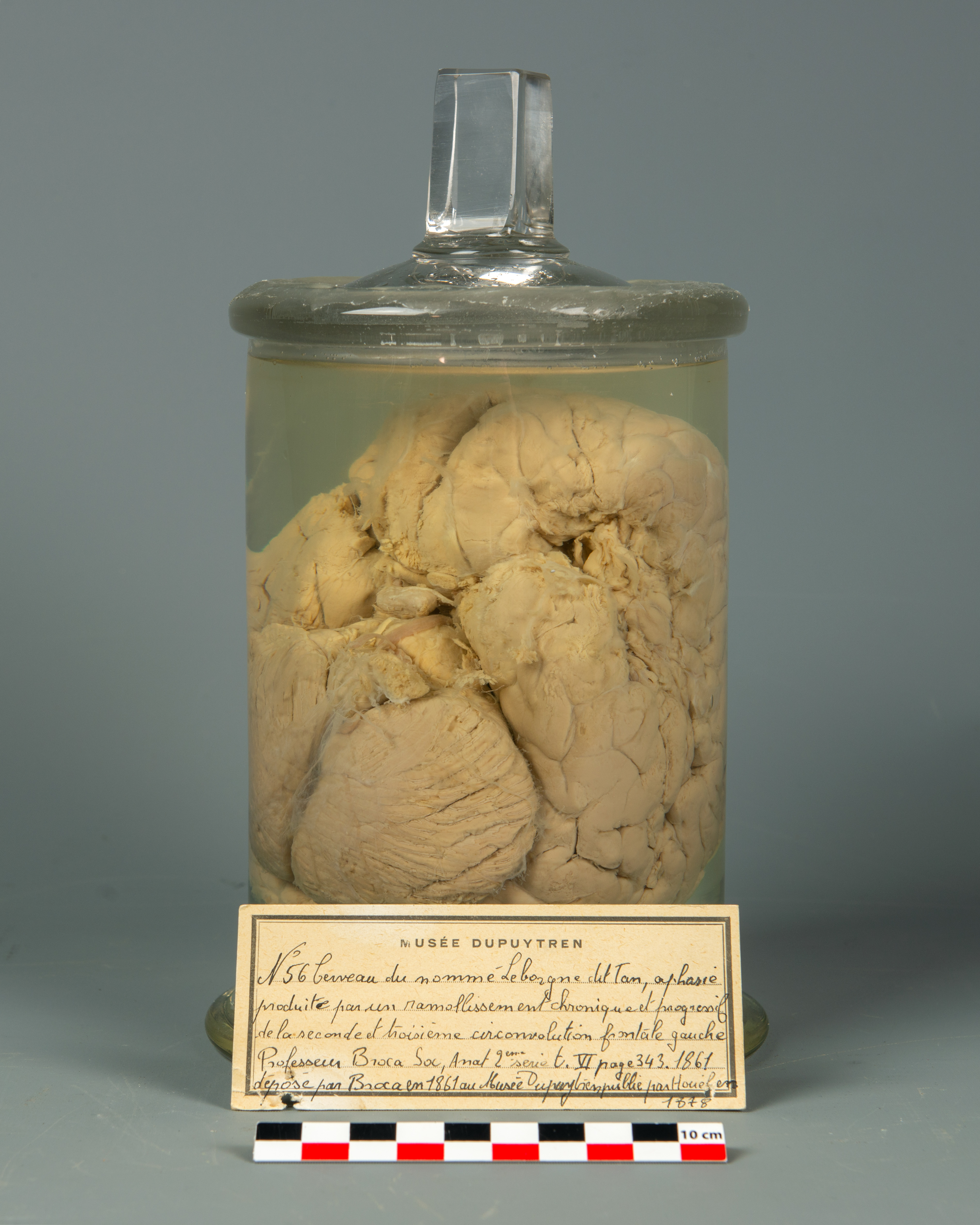
The brain of Victor Leborgne, a speechless patient who allowed Paul Broca to tie a specific brain region to language

Expressive aphasia was first identified by the French neurologist Paul Broca. By examining the brains of deceased individuals having acquired expressive aphasia in life, he concluded that language ability is localized in the ventroposterior region of the frontal lobe. One of the most important aspects of Paul Broca's discovery was the observation that the loss of proper speech in expressive aphasia is due to the brain's loss of ability to produce language, as opposed to the mouth's loss of ability to produce words.

The discoveries of Paul Broca were made during the same period of time as the German Neurologist Carl Wernicke, who was also studying brains of aphasiacs post-mortem and identified the region now known as Wernicke's area. Discoveries of both men contributed to the concept of localization, which states that specific brain functions are all localized to a specific area of the brain. While both men made significant contributions to the field of aphasia, it was Carl Wernicke who realized the difference between patients with aphasia that could not produce language and those that could not comprehend language (the essential difference between expressive and receptive aphasia).

== See also ==
- Broca's area
- Transcortical sensory aphasia
- Wernicke's aphasia
- Word salad

== Sources ==
- Berthier, Marcelo (2005). "Poststroke Aphasia". Drugs Aging. 22 (2): 163–182. doi:10.2165/00002512-200522020-00006. PMID 15733022. S2CID 22725166.
