= Receptive aphasia =

Type of fluent aphasias

- Other names: Wernicke's aphasia, posterior aphasia, sensory aphasia
- Broca's area and Wernicke's area
- Specialty: Neurology

In medicine and neurology, receptive aphasia or Wernicke's aphasia is a subclass of fluent aphasias in which individuals have difficulty understanding written and spoken language because of damage to a distributed network of brain regions involved in language comprehension rather than a single isolated area. Patients with Wernicke's aphasia often have fluent speech, which is characterized by typical speech rate and effortless speech output, but the content may lack meaning or include incorrect or made-up words. Writing often reflects speech by lacking substantive content or meaning, and may contain paraphasias or neologisms, similar to how spoken language is affected. In most cases, motor deficits (i.e., hemiparesis) do not occur in individuals with Wernicke's aphasia. Therefore, they may produce a large amount of speech without much meaning. Individuals with Wernicke's aphasia commonly show anosognosia, meaning they may be unaware of their errors in speech and may not realize that their spoken language lacks meaning. They typically remain unaware of even their most profound language deficits.

Like many acquired language disorders, Wernicke's aphasia can be experienced in many different ways and to many different degrees. Patients diagnosed with Wernicke's aphasia can show severe language comprehension deficits; however, this is dependent on the severity and extent of the lesion. Severity levels may range from being unable to understand even the simplest spoken and/or written information to missing minor details of a conversation. Many diagnosed with Wernicke's aphasia have difficulty with repetition in words and sentences and/or working memory.

Wernicke's aphasia was named after German physician Carl Wernicke, who is credited with discovering the area of the brain responsible for language comprehension (Wernicke's area) and discovery of the condition which results from a lesion to this brain area (Wernicke's aphasia). Although Wernicke's area (left posterior superior temporal cortex) is known as the language comprehension area of the brain, defining the exact region of the brain is a more complicated issue. A 2016 study asked neuroscientists what portion of the brain they consider to be Wernicke's area, and results suggested that the classic "Wernicke–Lichtheim–Geschwind" model does not fully account for modern evidence about the distributed network of cortical and subcortical regions involved in language processing. This is because this model was created using an old understanding of human brain anatomy and does not take into consideration the cortical and subcortical structures responsible for language or the connectivity of brain areas necessary for production and comprehension of language. While there is no single, well-defined area solely responsible for language comprehension, Wernicke's aphasia is a well-documented clinical condition in which individuals have difficulty understanding language due to damage in key parts of the language network.

A better way to describe aphasia is fluent or non-fluent rather than "expressive" or "receptive" given the typical presence of both expressive and receptive language deficits in all subtypes of aphasia.

== Signs and symptoms ==
People with Wernicke's aphasia often produce fluent but disorganized speech. Such speech may contain neologisms (made-up words) and semantic paraphasias (word substitutions). Although their speech sounds fluent, it can be difficult to follow because the content lacks meaning.

The following are common symptoms seen in patients with Wernicke's aphasia:

- Impaired comprehension: deficits in understanding (receptive) written and spoken language. This is because Wernicke's area is responsible for assigning meaning to the language that is heard, so if it is damaged, the brain cannot comprehend the information that is being received.
- Poor word retrieval: ability to retrieve target words is impaired. This is also referred to as anomia, and it is often classified into the following subsets:
  - Word-selection anomia: this type of anomia describes patients who know the function of a certain object, and can single out the target object from a larger group of objects, but they do not have the ability to name the object. For example when shown different clothes items and asked to select the one meant to keep their head warm, they will correctly select the hat, but will not be able to state the name of the object. In some patients this type of anomia is specific to certain categories like colors or animals.
  - Semantic anomia: unlike patients with word-selection anomia, patients exhibiting semantic anomia also lose the ability to correctly distinguish the function or use of a given object, along with not being able to provide the name of it. Therefore, even provided with both the name and function of an object, these patients still would not be able to correctly select it out of a group.
  - Disconnection anomia or modality-specific anomia: this subset of anomia affects patients' ability to name or distinguish objects if they are presented through a certain sensory modality, and is caused by a disconnect between the given sensory cortex and the language centers of the brain. For example, a patient may be able to distinguish an apple from a banana when presented with their given smells, but not when they are presented the objects through only touch.
  - Phonemic substitution anomia: describes patients that exhibit paraphasia when trying to name objects. This can result in patients either selecting incorrect phonemes, such as saying 'bad' when shown an image of a 'bat', or they may simply try to use non-real words, or neologisms.
- Neologisms: Neologism is a Greek-derived word meaning "new word". The term is used in this sense to mean invented non-words that have no relation to the target word, such as "dorflur" for "shoe".
- Production of jargon: speech that lacks content, consists of typical intonation, and is structurally intact. Jargon can consist of a string of neologisms, as well as a combination of real words that do not make sense together in context. The jargon may include word salads.
- Fluent speech: individuals with Wernicke's aphasia do not have difficulty with producing connected speech that flows. Although the connection of the words may be appropriate, the words they are using may not belong together or make sense (Jargon). For example, a person might answer a simple question with a fluent but confusing sentence such as, "The dog of my chair went glimmering", illustrating intact speech flow but reduced meaningful content. Some patients with Wernicke's aphasia experience logorrhea, which is also known as over fluency. These patients use an excessive amount of words when speaking or writing.
- Awareness: Individuals with Wernicke's aphasia are often not aware of their incorrect productions, which would further explain why they do not correct themselves when they produce jargon, paraphasias, or neologisms. Additionally, patients may become irritated or frustrated because others cannot understand what they are saying, but they believe their speech is completely comprehensible.
- Paraphasias:
  - Phonemic (literal) paraphasia: Errors in selecting phonemes. Involves the substitution, addition, omission, or rearrangement of sounds so that an error can be defined as sounding like the target word. Often, half of the word is still intact which allows for easy comparison to the appropriate, original word (such as "bap" for "map"). The more phonemic paraphasias in a word, the harder it is to understand, to the extent at which may become unidentifiable. Often, these unidentifiable words are known as neologisms.
  - Semantic (verbal) paraphasia: Failure to select the proper words with which to convey their ideas. The word used is always a real word, however it may not always be directly or closely related to the word the patient is trying to convey. Can result in saying a word that is related to the target word in meaning or category (for example, "jet" for "helicopter", or "knife" for "fork"). Other times, semantic paraphasias can result in empty speech, or the use of overly generic words such as "thing" or "stuff" to stand in for the word they cannot come up with. This leads to speech that contains real words but lacks any substantial meaning.
- Circumlocution: talking around the target word, for example: "Uhhh, it's white... it's flat... you write on it..." (when referencing paper).
- Pressured speech: Wernicke's patient's inclination to run on their speech. Often described as an overabundance of speech. Common in Wernicke's patients due to the ease at which they produce speech, circumlocution, and lack of self-monitoring. As an example, a clinician asks, "What do you do at a supermarket?" and the answerer states, "Well, the supermarket is a place. It is a place with a lot of food. My favorite food is Italian food. At a supermarket, I buy different kinds of food. There are carts and baskets. Supermarkets have lots of customers, and workers..."
- Lack of hemiparesis: typically, no motor deficits are seen with a localized lesion in Wernicke's area.
- Reduced retention span: reduced ability to retain information for extended periods of time.
- Impairments in reading and writing: impairments can be seen in both reading and writing with differing severity levels.

Wernicke's aphasia symptom checklist
Symptom	Patients with Wernicke's aphasia
Comprehension of spoken material	Impaired (can range from mild to severe)
Segmental phonology	Impaired (phonemic paraphasia, neologisms, jargon)
Word selection	Impaired (semantic paraphasia, empty speech)
Word semantics	Normal
Fluency (production of speech)	Normal or overly fluent (logorrhea)
Production of writing	Normal
Use of function words	Normal
Grammaticality	Normal or mildly impaired (paragrammatism)
Repetition of what others say	Impaired
Controversial proficiency	Normal
Concern about impairment	Little to none
Concern about errors in language	Little to none
Short-term retention and recall of verbal materials	Impaired

=== Distinction from other types of aphasia/other conditions ===
- Expressive aphasia (non-fluent Broca's aphasia): this is generally considered the second main categorization of aphasia, where individuals have great difficulty forming complete sentences with generally only basic content words (leaving out words like "is" and "the"). Unlike Wernicke's aphasia, which causes patients to speak fluently, but producing a jumbled mix of nonsensical words, people with Broca's aphasia speak slowly, and typically in small sentences, yet they are much more able to convey the intended meaning of the sentence. Additionally, while people with Wernicke's aphasia typically are unaware of their confusing language and may get frustrated with the listener for not understanding them, people with Broca's aphasia are completely aware of their language difficulties and can sometimes become frustrated with themselves.
- Global aphasia: individuals have extreme difficulties with both expressive (producing language) and receptive (understanding language).
- Anomic aphasia: the biggest hallmark is one's poor word-finding abilities; one's speech is fluent and appropriate, but full of circumlocutions (evident in both writing and speech).
- Conduction aphasia: individuals can comprehend what is being said and are fluent in spontaneous speech, but they cannot repeat what is being said to them.
- Transcortical sensory aphasia: individuals have impaired auditory comprehension with intact repetition and fluent speech.
- Progressive confluent aphasia: A form of frontotemporal dementia characterized by motor speech impairment, agrammatism, laborious speech, and apraxia of speech. It is understood that comprehension of speech and semantic memory are relatively preserved. Symptoms progress over time unlike many other aphasias where symptoms appear immediately after stroke.
- Wernicke–Korsakoff syndrome: A well-described syndrome of neurological and cognitive problems that comprises both Wernicke's Encephalopathy (WE) and Korsakoff Syndrome (KS). It is often characterized by impairment in memory formation and is caused by long term thiamine deficiency.

== Causes ==
The most common cause of Wernicke's aphasia is stroke. Strokes may occur when blood flow to the brain is completely interrupted or severely reduced. This has a direct effect on the amount of oxygen and nutrients being able to supply the brain, which causes brain cells to die within minutes. The most common stroke that causes Wernicke's aphasia is an ischemic stroke affecting the posterior temporal lobe of the dominant hemisphere of the brain. "The middle cerebral arteries supply blood to the cortical areas involved in speech, language and swallowing. The left middle cerebral artery provides Broca's area, Wernicke's area, Heschl's gyrus, and the angular gyrus with blood". Therefore, in patients with Wernicke's aphasia, there is typically an occlusion to the left middle cerebral artery.

As a result of the occlusion in the left middle cerebral artery, Wernicke's aphasia is most commonly caused by a lesion in the posterior superior temporal gyrus (Wernicke's area). This area is posterior to the primary auditory cortex (PAC) which is responsible for decoding individual speech sounds. Wernicke's primary responsibility is to assign meaning to these speech sounds. The extent of the lesion will determine the severity of the patients deficits related to language. Damage to the surrounding areas (perisylvian region) may also result in Wernicke's aphasia symptoms due to variation in individual neuroanatomical structure and any co-occurring damage in adjacent areas of the brain.

Another common cause of Wernicke's aphasia is encephalitis, specifically around the posterior superior temporal gyrus. Encephalitis is the inflammation of the brain, which can be a result of infection, autoimmune disorders, or chronic substance abuse, among others. Other causes of Wernicke's aphasia include brain trauma, cerebral tumors, central nervous system (CNS) infections, and degenerative brain disorders. In the case of brain tumors, infections, or degenerative brain disorders, examples in which damage to the brain can be ongoingly progressive, it is likely that the aphasia will coincidingly progress as well, and symptoms will worsen if the cause is not treated.

== Diagnosis ==
Aphasia is usually first recognized by the physician who treats the person for his or her brain injury. Most individuals will undergo a magnetic resonance imaging (MRI) or computed tomography (CT) scan to confirm the presence of a brain injury and to identify its precise location. In circumstances where a person is showing possible signs of aphasia, the physician will refer him or her to a speech–language pathologist (SLP) for a comprehensive speech and language evaluation. SLPs will examine the individual's ability to express him or herself through speech, understand language in written and spoken forms, write independently, and perform socially.

The American Speech–Language–Hearing Association (ASHA) states a comprehensive assessment should be conducted in order to analyze the patient's communication functioning on multiple levels; as well as the effect of possible communication deficits on activities of daily living. Typical components of an aphasia assessment include: case history, self report, oral-motor examination, language skills, identification of environmental and personal factors, and the assessment results. A comprehensive aphasia assessment includes both formal and informal measures.

Formal assessments include:

- Boston Diagnostic Aphasia Examination (BDAE): diagnoses the presence and type of aphasia, focusing on location of lesion and the underlying linguistic processes.
- Western Aphasia Battery – Revised (WAB): determines the presence, severity, and type of aphasia; and can also determine baseline abilities of patient.
- Communication Activities of Daily Living – Second Edition (CADL-2): measures functional communication abilities; focuses on reading, writing, social interactions, and varying levels of communication.
- Revised Token Test (RTT): assess receptive language and auditory comprehension; focuses on patient's ability to follow directions.

Informal assessments, which aid in the diagnosis of patients with suspected aphasia, include:

- Conversational speech and language sample
- Family interview
- Case history or medical chart review
- Behavioral observations

Diagnostic information should be scored and analyzed appropriately. Treatment plans and individual goals should be developed based on diagnostic information, as well as patient and caregiver needs, desires, and priorities.

== Treatment ==
There is currently no standardized treatment for Wernicke's aphasia, meaning treatment varies from patient to patient depending on the severity of the lesion and the resulting deficits. In some patients, the first step of action is to attempt to treat the possible causes for the aphasia, such as removing a brain tumor, or treating a nervous system infection. This may not lessen the symptoms for the patient as damage to the brain is often already done, but it typically stops the aphasia from worsening. For the majority of patients with any kind of aphasia, speech and language therapy is the primary treatment. This focuses on improving language skills and learning how to communicate in various ways to allow their needs to be met. Since Wernicke's patients face comprehension deficits, they are often unaware of their condition and may pose unique challenges for their treatment because of this lack of awareness or concern for their deficit. Treatment plans are usually devised by a team of healthcare workers including a speech therapist, neuropsychologist, and a neurologist.

According to Bates et al. (2005), "the primary goal of rehabilitation is to prevent complications, minimize impairments, and maximize function". The topics of intensity and timing of intervention are widely debated across various fields. Results are contradictory: some studies indicate better outcomes with early intervention, while other studies indicate starting therapy too early may be detrimental to the patient's recovery. Recent research suggests, that therapy be functional and focus on communication goals that are appropriate for the patient's individual lifestyle.

Specific treatment considerations for working with individuals with Wernicke's aphasia (or those who exhibit deficits in auditory comprehension) include using familiar materials, using shorter and slower utterances when speaking, giving direct instructions, and using repetition as needed.

=== Artificial intelligence and aphasia ===
Research on the use of artificial intelligence (AI) in aphasia patients has expanded in tandem with the development of large-language models. Large language models are deep-learning networks that train within a large data set. Their purpose is to predict word occurrences on the basis of word vectors that mathematically represent the meaning of words. Using their training dataset, large-language models can form coherent, meaningful language in response to meaningless text. While technological aids like spell and grammar checks have improved patients' abilities to write, they do not generate meaningful writing. Thus, a 2025 case report sought to examine whether AI can provide support in this scenario.

According to the National Aphasia Association, more advanced treatments like brain implants are able to convert brain signals to integrated speech; however, these tools are currently unable to serve aphasia patients at this time. This is because they require all areas of the brain to be intact, whereas receptive aphasia is caused by damage to a region of the left posterior superior temporal cortex, often from a stroke. A single case report published in the National Library of Medicine database describes a 75-year-old patient suffering from aphasia who struggled to meaningfully produce language to write his autobiography, despite the fact that his functioning had significantly improved since his stroke years prior. The study aimed to improve this patient's ability to write and edit independently without sacrificing meaning and accuracy. The authors reported that the patient was able to generate enough meaningful text with the assistance of ChatGPT. Additionally, a year later, the patient expressed that ChatGPT had continued to allow him to write meaningfully, even writing his own songs.

=== Role of neuroplasticity in recovery ===
Neuroplasticity is defined as the brain's ability to reorganize itself, lay new pathways, and rearrange existing ones, as a result of experience. Neuronal changes after damage to the brain such as collateral sprouting, increased activation of the homologous areas, and map extension demonstrate the brain's neuroplastic abilities. According to Thomson, "Portions of the right hemisphere, extended left brain sites, or both have been shown to be recruited to perform language functions after brain damage. All of the neuronal changes recruit areas not originally or directly responsible for large portions of linguistic processing. Principles of neuroplasticity have been proven effective in neurorehabilitation after damage to the brain. These principles include: incorporating multiple modalities into treatment to create stronger neural connections, using stimuli that evoke positive emotion, linking concepts with simultaneous and related presentations, and finding the appropriate intensity and duration of treatment for each individual patient.

=== Auditory comprehension treatment ===
Auditory comprehension is a primary focus in treatment for Wernicke's aphasia, as it is the main deficit related to this diagnosis. Therapy activities may include:

- Single-word comprehension: A common treatment method used to support single-word comprehension skills is known as a pointing drill. Through this method, clinicians lay out a variety of images in front of a patient. The patient is asked to point to the image that corresponds to the word provided by the clinician.
- Understanding spoken sentences: "Treatment to improve comprehension of spoken sentences typically consists of drills in which patients answer questions, follow directions or verify the meaning of sentences".
- Understanding conversation: An effective treatment method to support comprehension of discourse includes providing a patient with a conversational sample and asking him or her questions about that sample. Individuals with less severe deficits in auditory comprehension may also be able to retell aspects of the conversation.

=== Word retrieval ===
Anomia is consistently seen in aphasia, so many treatment techniques aim to help patients with word finding problems. One example of a semantic approach is referred to as semantic feature analyses. The process includes naming the target object shown in the picture and producing words that are semantically related to the target. Through production of semantically similar features, participants develop more skills in naming stimuli due to the increase in lexical activation.

=== Restorative therapy approach ===
Neuroplasticity is a central component to restorative therapy to compensate for brain damage. This approach is especially useful in Wernicke's aphasia patients that have had a stroke to the left brain hemisphere.

Schuell's stimulation approach is a main method in traditional aphasia therapy that follows principles to retrieve function in the auditory modality of language and influence surrounding regions through stimulation. The guidelines to have the most effective stimulation are as follows: Auditory stimulation of language should be intensive and always present when other language modalities are stimulated.

- The stimulus should be presented at a difficulty level equal to or just below the patient's ability.
- Sensory stimulation must be present and repeated throughout the treatment.
- Each stimulus applied should produce a response; if there is no response more stimulation cues should be provided.
- Response to stimuli should be maximized to create more opportunities for success and feedback for the speech–language pathologist.
- The feedback of the speech–language pathologist should promote further success and patient and encouragement.
- Therapy should follow an intensive and systemic method to create success by progressing in difficulty.
- Therapies should be varied and build off of mastered therapy tasks.

Schuell's stimulation utilizes stimulation through therapy tasks beginning at a simplified task and progressing to become more difficult including:

- Point to tasks. During these tasks the patient is directed to point to an object or multiple objects. As the skill is learned the level of complexity increases by increasing the number of objects the patient must point to.
  - Simple: "Point to the book."
  - Complex: "Point to the book and then to the ceiling after touching your ear."
- Following directions with objects. During these tasks the patient is instructed to follow the instruction of manually following directions that increase in complexity as the skill is learned.
  - Simple: "Pick up the book."
  - Complex: "Pick up the book and put it down on the bench after I move the cup."
- Yes or no questions – This task requires the patient to respond to various yes or no questions that can range from simple to complex.
  - Paraphrasing and retelling – This task requires the patient to read a paragraph and, afterwards, paraphrase it aloud. This is the most complex of Schuell's stimulation tasks because it requires comprehension, recall, and communication.

=== Social approach to treatment ===
The social approach involves a collaborative effort on behalf of patients and clinicians to determine goals and outcomes for therapy that could improve the patient's quality of life. A conversational approach is thought to provide opportunities for development and the use of strategies to overcome barriers to communication. The main goals of this treatment method are to improve the patient's conversational confidence and skills in natural contexts using conversational coaching, supported conversations, and partner training.

- Conversational coaching involves patients with aphasia and their speech language pathologists, who serve as a "coach" discussing strategies to approach various communicative scenarios. The "coach" will help the patient develop a script for a scenario (such as ordering food at a restaurant), and help the patient practice and perform the scenario in and out of the clinic while evaluating the outcome.
- Supported conversation also involves using a communicative partner who supports the patient's learning by providing contextual cues, slowing their own rate of speech, and increasing their message's redundancy to promote the patient's comprehension.

Additionally, it is important to include the families of patients with aphasia in treatment programs. Clinicians can teach family members how to support one another, and how to adjust their speaking patterns to facilitate their loved one's treatment and rehabilitation.

Speech devices, while not a treatment that can improve a patient's language skills, help the patient communicate with caregivers through the use of pictures or speech.

=== Clinical trials ===
More recently, researchers are developing medical treatments for aphasia using clinical trials for pharmacological and non-pharmacological approaches. Some medications include drugs affecting the catecholaminergic system, nootropic drugs, and medications used to treat Alzheimer's disease. The non-pharmacological approaches include transcranial magnetic stimulation and transcranial direct stimulation.

== Prognosis ==
Prognosis is strongly dependent on the location and extent of the lesion (damage) to the brain. Many personal factors also influence how a person will recover, which include age, previous medical history, level of education, gender, and motivation. All of these factors influence the brain's ability to adapt to change, restore previous skills, and learn new skills. It is important to remember that all the presentations of Receptive Aphasia may vary. The presentation of symptoms and prognosis are both dependent on personal components related to the individual's neural organization before the stroke, the extent of the damage, and the influence of environmental and behavioral factors after the damage occurs. The quicker a diagnosis of a stroke is made by a medical team, the more positive the patient's recovery may be. A medical team will work to control the signs and symptoms of the stroke and rehabilitation therapy will begin to manage and recover lost skills. The rehabilitation team may consist of a certified speech–language pathologist, physical therapist, occupational therapist, and the family or caregivers. The length of therapy will be different for everyone, but research suggests that intense therapy over a short amount of time can improve outcomes of speech and language therapy for patients with aphasia. Research is not suggesting the only way therapy should be administered, but gives insight on how therapy affects the patient's prognosis.

== See also ==
- Agraphia
- Logorrhea (psychology)
- Paragrammatism
