= Wernicke's area =

Speech comprehension region in the dominant hemisphere of the hominid brain

- Wernicke's area is located in the temporal lobe, shown here in white.

Details
- Location: Temporal lobe of the dominant cerebral hemisphere
- Artery: Branches from the middle cerebral artery

Identifiers
- MeSH: D065813
- NeuroNames: 1233
- NeuroLex ID: nlx_144087
- FMA: 242178

Wernicke's area (/ˈvɛərnɪkə/; German: [ˈvɛɐ̯nɪkə]), sometimes referred to as Wernicke's speech region, is one of the two principal regions of the brain associated with language, the other being Broca's area. This region plays a major role in understanding both spoken and written language, while Broca's area is mainly responsible for producing speech. Traditionally, Wernicke's area has been described as lying within Brodmann area 22 in the superior temporal gyrus of the dominant hemisphere, typically the left hemisphere in roughly 95% of right-handed individuals and about 70% of left-handed people.

Damage to this region typically produces a form of receptive, fluent aphasia. People with this condition usually speak with normal flow and rhythm, yet their utterances lack meaningful content. This contrasts with non-fluent aphasia, in which a person may use meaningful words but struggles to form smooth, connected speech, instead speaking in short, telegraphic fragments.

The developmental course of Wernicke's area suggests that its contribution to language changes across childhood. Research on the maturation of neural pathways linked to this region indicates that it supports the growing sophistication of both language comprehension and production as children develop.

== Structure ==
Wernicke's area is now often understood to encompass the posterior portion of the superior temporal gyrus (STG) and to extend into nearby regions such as the angular gyrus and parts of the parietal lobe. This broader anatomical description reflects a more intricate and variable language network than older, more localized models suggested. Substantial individual variability exists in the exact size and boundaries of this region, which challenges earlier assumptions that Wernicke's area has a fixed, uniform location in all people.

Despite many decades of investigation, there is still no universal agreement on its precise borders. Some researchers associate Wernicke's area primarily with the unimodal auditory association cortex located just anterior to primary auditory cortex in the STG (the anterior part of BA 22). This part of the STG is one of the regions most consistently implicated in auditory word recognition by functional imaging experiments. Others argue that adjacent parts of the heteromodal cortex in BA 39 and BA40 of the parietal lobe also belong to this functional language network. As a result, recent work increasingly portrays "Wernicke's area" not as a single, sharply defined anatomical region, but as a set of interconnected posterior temporal and parietal areas that jointly support language processing.

Furthermore, white matter studies have refined the classic view of how Wernicke's area interacts with frontal language regions. The arcuate fasciculus, once thought to directly link Wernicke's and Broca's areas, is now understood to connect posterior receptive regions with premotor and motor cortices rather than Broca's area specifically. In parallel, the uncinate fasciculus links anterior superior temporal regions with Broca's area, in keeping with its role in pathways involved in word recognition and lexical processing.

== Function ==
=== Right homologous area ===
Studies employing transcranial magnetic stimulation indicate that the cortical region in the non-dominant hemisphere corresponding to Wernicke's area contributes to resolving less common meanings of ambiguous words. For instance, when hearing the word "bank", the right-hemisphere homologue is more engaged in interpreting meanings such as "riverbank", while the dominant-hemisphere Wernicke's area is more active in processing the more frequent financial meaning ("teller" given "bank").

=== Modern views ===
Newer neuroimaging findings emphasize that language comprehension relies on a distributed network of brain regions rather than a simple division between Wernicke's and Broca's areas. Within this network, Wernicke's area tends to work in concert with multiple temporal, parietal, and frontal regions to process both verbal and nonverbal auditory input, broadening our understanding of its functional role in language.

Regions such as the middle and inferior temporal gyri, along with parts of the basal temporal cortex, have been implicated in lexical processing, while substantial evidence points to the STG and the STS as key sites for the computations required for recognizing speech sounds. At the same time, aspects of Broca's area (Brodmann areas 44 and 45) continue to appear in studies of speech processing. Overall, the brain regions involved in speech perception extend far beyond the classic language areas, even though many textbooks still describe Wernicke's area as the primary center for this function.

Additional work with native American Sign Language users shows that the brain recruits somewhat different networks depending on whether grammatical relationships are expressed by word order or by inflection. In one such study, frontal regions associated with sequencing information were more active when syntax was conveyed by word order, whereas temporal regions involved in segmenting information showed stronger responses when grammar was expressed through inflectional changes in sign location or movement. However, these regions also overlap, suggesting that the brain relies on shared computational strategies to understand different types of linguistic structure.

More recent imaging work highlights Wernicke's area as a central contributor to subtler aspects of language, including interpreting ambiguous words, processing semantic relationships, and integrating contextual information. Its functions also appear to extend to understanding figurative expressions and certain non-verbal communicative cues. Comparative studies in non-human primates have identified analogous posterior temporal–parietal regions, offering insight into the evolutionary foundations of human communication and supporting the view that aspects of Wernicke's area may have emerged from earlier neural systems involved in processing complex sounds and meanings.

== Clinical significance ==
Human brain with Wernicke's area highlighted in red

=== Aphasia ===
Wernicke's area is named after Carl Wernicke, a German neurologist and psychiatrist who, in 1874, proposed that damage to the left posterior portion of the superior temporal gyrus disrupts the ability to associate the sensory and motor representations of spoken words. This work helped establish the concept of receptive aphasia, now commonly known as Wernicke's aphasia. Individuals with this syndrome typically show severely impaired comprehension while maintaining fluent, rhythmically normal speech with relatively intact syntax. Because the intended meaning is distorted or absent, their language may seem nonsensical or filled with invented words, and is often described as fluent or jargon aphasia.

Wernicke's area receives input from the auditory cortex and plays a major role in assigning meaning to words. As a result, injury to this region can lead to speech that sounds fluent but lacks meaningful content and often contains paraphasic errors or neologisms. Semantic paraphasias involve substituting one real word for another, whereas phonemic paraphasias involve replacing or rearranging sounds or syllables. Prosody and sentence structure are often relatively preserved, even though the intended meaning is missing. In contrast to Broca's aphasia, patients with Wernicke's aphasia are usually unaware of their deficits and may also have significant difficulties with reading, writing, and repetition.

The most frequent cause of Wernicke's aphasia is damage to the posterior temporal lobe of the dominant hemisphere. The underlying lesion is often due to an ischemic stroke, in which an arterial thrombus or embolus restricts blood flow to that region. Head trauma, central nervous system infections, neurodegenerative disorders, and neoplasms can produce similar patterns of impairment. A cerebrovascular event is more likely when aphasic symptoms develop suddenly, whereas a gradual onset tends to point toward a degenerative condition. Imaging techniques such as computed tomography (CT) or magnetic resonance imaging (MRI) are commonly employed to identify the location and extent of the lesion. In cases where seizures are suspected, electroencephalography (EEG) may help detect transient aphasia related to epileptic activity, although this is a less common cause.

Diagnosis typically involves evaluating fluency, comprehension, naming, repetition, and writing. In Wernicke's aphasia, fluency is generally normal, but comprehension and repetition are impaired. Clinicians also examine the content of spontaneous and elicited speech for semantic and phonemic paraphasias as well as neologisms. In severe cases, patients may produce long strings of invented words with only a few connecting terms, a pattern often referred to as jargon. Some individuals rely on vague placeholders such as "stuff" or "things" when they cannot retrieve specific vocabulary, and they may talk around missing words in a process known as circumlocution. Reduced self-monitoring can lead to excessive, rambling speech, or logorrhea. A complete neurologic examination is important to distinguish aphasia from other causes of altered mental status with abnormal speech and comprehension.

As an example, a patient with Wernicke's aphasia was once asked what had brought him to the hospital. His response was,

Is this some of the work that we work as we did before? ... All right ... From when wine [why] I'm here. What's wrong with me because I ... was myself until the taenz took something about the time between me and my regular time in that time and they took the time in that time here and that's when the time took around here and saw me around in it's started with me no time and I bekan [began] work of nothing else that's the way the doctor find me that way...

Such extended but largely incomprehensible speech illustrates the striking disconnect between fluent delivery and impaired comprehension in Wernicke's aphasia.

Although lesions involving Wernicke's area often result in receptive aphasia, the relationship is not absolute. Some individuals, particularly a subset of left-handed people, may rely more on the right hemisphere for certain language functions. In addition, isolated cortical damage that spares underlying white matter and other associated regions may not produce severe comprehension deficits. Research has also shown that patients with posterior lesions frequently struggle to interpret nonverbal environmental sounds, such as animal calls or mechanical noises, sometimes even more than spoken words. These findings suggest that Wernicke's area contributes to broader auditory processing beyond language alone.

== See also ==
- Temporoparietal junction
