= Conduction aphasia =

Inability to repeat speech despite being able to perceive and produce it

- Other names: Associative aphasia
- Broca's area and Wernicke's area of the brain, which are also terms for different types of aphasia
- Specialty: Neurology

Conduction aphasia, also called associative aphasia, is an acquired language disorder, most commonly caused by left-hemisphere cerebrovascular injury. It is characterized by fluent, grammatically correct speech with frequent phonemic paraphasias and a disproportionately severe impairment of verbatim repetition (difficulty repeating words, nonwords, and sentences) despite relatively preserved auditory comprehension. Affected people are fully capable of understanding what they are hearing, but fail to encode phonological information for production. This deficit is load-sensitive as the person shows significant difficulty repeating phrases, particularly as the phrases increase in length and complexity and as they stumble over words they are attempting to pronounce. People have frequent errors during spontaneous speech, such as substituting or transposing sounds. They are also aware of their errors and will show significant difficulty correcting them. Conduction aphasia is associated with disruption of the dorsal auditory-motor/phonological system in the left temporo-parietal region (often implicating the Sylvian-parietal-temporal area, posterior superior temporal and supramarginal gyri, and in some cases underlying white matter such as the arcuate fasciculus). Modern lesion-mapping and functional imaging work emphasize cortical temporo-parietal contributions to the syndrome in addition to classical white-matter disconnection hypotheses.

In 1970, Tim Shallice and Elizabeth Warrington were able to differentiate two variants of this constellation: the reproduction and the repetition type. These authors suggested an exclusive deficit of auditory-verbal short-term memory in repetition conduction aphasia whereas the other variant was assumed to reflect disrupted phonological encoding mechanism, affecting confrontation tasks such as repetition, reading and naming in a similar manner.

Left-hemisphere damage involving auditory regions often result in speech deficits. Lesions in this area that damage the sensorimotor dorsal stream suggest that the sensory system aid in motor speech. Studies have suggested that conduction aphasia is a result of damage specifically to the left superior temporal gyrus and/or the left supramarginal gyrus. The classical explanation for conduction aphasia is a disconnection between the brain areas responsible for speech comprehension (Wernicke's area) and that of speech production (Broca's area). This is due to specific damage to the arcuate fasciculus, a deep white matter tract. Aphasic people are still able to comprehend speech as the lesion does not disrupt the ventral stream pathway.

== Signs and symptoms ==
Conduction aphasics will show relatively well-preserved auditory comprehension, which may even be completely functional. All cases are individualized and unique to their own extent. Speech production will be fluent, grammatically, and syntactically correct. Intonation and articulation will also be maintained. Speech often contains some paraphasic errors: phonemes and syllables will be dropped or transposed (e.g., "snowball" → "snowall", "television" → "vellitision", "ninety-five percent" → "ninety-twenty percent"). The hallmark deficit of this disorder, however, is in repetition. Aphasic people will show an inability to repeat words or sentences when asked by an examiner. After saying a sentence to a person with conduction aphasia, he or she will be able to paraphrase the sentence accurately but will not be able to repeat it. This is possibly because their "motor speech error processing is disrupted by inaccurate forward predictions, or because detected errors are not translated into corrective commands due to damage to the auditory-motor interface". When prompted to repeat words, the person will be unable to do so, and produce many paraphasic errors. For example, when prompted with "bagger", a person may respond with, "gabber". Recent summaries about the syndrome show similarities between defective speech and writing and their relatively good comprehension. The sudden speech of a conduction aphasic is fluent, yet it is lengthy and inadequately structured. Aphasic people have difficulty in finding words appropriate to context and in accurately pronouncing a word. Aphasic errors in naming, reading aloud, and repeating are recognized.

Individuals with conduction aphasia are able to express themselves fairly well, with some word finding and functional comprehension difficulty. Although people with aphasia may be able to express themselves fairly well, they tend to have issues repeating phrases, especially phrases that are long and complex. During an assessment of aphasia, the clinician usually examine the person's verbal fluency, comprehension, repetition, reading, writing, and naming. When asked to repeat something, the person will be unable to do so without significant difficulty, repeatedly attempting to self-correct (conduite d'approche).

People with conduction aphasia recognize their errors and will repetitively try to correct them. This recognition is due to preserved auditory error detection mechanisms. Errors frequently fit a pattern of incorrect approximations. These common errors typically occur in morphemes that a) share one or more similarly located phonemes but b) differ in at least one aspect that makes the substituted morpheme(s) semantically distinct. Repetitive self correction is commonly used by Aphasic people of conduction aphasia. Due to their relatively preserved auditory comprehension, conduction aphasics are capable of accurately monitoring, and attempting to correct, their own errors in speech output.

Conduction aphasia is a mild language disability, and most people return to their normal lives. Broca's and Wernicke's aphasia are commonly caused by middle cerebral artery strokes. Symptoms of conduction aphasia, as with other aphasias, can be transient, sometimes lasting only several hours or a few days. As aphasias and other language disorders are frequently due to stroke, their symptoms can change and evolve over time, or simply disappear. If the cause is a stroke, people can make a good recovery but may have persistent deficits. This is because the healing in the brain after inflammation or hemorrhage, leads to decreased local impairment. Furthermore, the plasticity of the brain may allow the recruitment of new pathways to restore lost function. For example, the right hemisphere speech systems may learn to correct for left-hemisphere damage. However, chronic conduction aphasia is possible, without transformation to other aphasias. These people show prolonged, profound deficits in repetition, frequent phonemic paraphasias, and repetitive self-correction during spontaneous speech.

=== Examples of conduction aphasia ===
Clinician: Now, I want you to say some words after me. Say 'boy'.

Aphasic: Boy.

Clinician: Home.

Aphasic: Home.

Clinician: Seventy-nine.

Aphasic: Ninety-seven. No ... sevinty-sine ... siventy-nice...

Clinician: Let's try another one. Say 'refrigerator'.

Aphasic: Frigilator ... no? how about ... frerigilator ... no frigaliterlater ... aahh! It's all mixed up!

== Causes ==
The most common cause of conduction aphasia is ischemic stroke affecting left perisylvian regions, especially in the temporo-parietal area. Historically, conduction aphasia was attributed to disruption of the arcuate fasciculus. Subsequent lesion-mapping and diffusion-MRI studies have shown that many cases arise from cortical damage to left posterior superior temporal and inferior parietal regions, though isolated arcuate fasciculus damage producing conduction aphasia have also been reported. When this area is damaged, the person experiences damage to the auditory-motor integration system. This results in disruption to the delayed auditory feedback network, causing the individual to have difficulty correcting themselves on speech repetition tasks. Additionally, recent evidence suggests that conduction aphasia can also be caused by lesions in the left superior temporal gyrus and/or the left supramarginal gyrus.

Conduction aphasia can also be seen in cases of cortical damage without subcortical extensions.

== Pathophysiology ==
Recent research has pointed to multiple different explanations for conduction aphasia, which is based on newer models suggesting language is facilitated by "cortically based, anatomically distributed, modular networks."

Conduction aphasia has been argued to reflect impairment of the dorsal stream and associated sensorimotor integration zone in the left posterior temporo-parietal cortex. This area supports the short-term maintenance and transformation of phonological information needed for accurate repetition. Group lesion-symptom mapping and aggregate lesion/fMRI analyses have repeatedly implicated left posterior temporo-parietal cortex (including supramarginal and posterior superior temporal gyri) in the repetition deficit, though focal damage to the arcuate fasciculus (white matter) can also produce a conduction-like syndrome in some patients.

== Diagnosis ==
Several standardized test batteries exist for diagnosing and classifying aphasias. These tests are capable of identifying conduction aphasia with relative accuracy. The Boston Diagnostic Aphasia Examination (BDAE) and the Western Aphasia Battery (WAB) are two commonly used test batteries for diagnosing conduction aphasia. These examinations involve a set of tests, which include asking the person to name pictures, read printed words, count aloud, and repeat words and non-words (such as shwazel). Neuro-imaging should also be used to look for a stroke, tumor, infection, or another pathology in the setting of conduction aphasia. This can be done through a CT or MRI or the brain; these are the first imaging modality of choice. Research using voxel-based lesion-symptom mapping, diffusion tensor imaging (DTI) tractography and task fMRI has clarified the anatomy underlying conduction aphasia. These studies generally point to the left temporo-parietal cortex and associated dorsal stream pathways as critical for repetition and phonological short-term memory. Group analyses and aggregate lesion/fMRI studies provide converging evidence for cortical temporo-parietal junction and planum temporale involvement.

== Treatment ==
Treatment for Aphasia is generally individualized, focusing on specific language and communication improvements, and regular exercise with communication tasks. Regular therapy for conduction aphasics has been shown to result in steady improvement on the Western Aphasia Battery. The Western Aphasia Battery assesses neurological disorders to discern the degree and type of aphasia present. The test also discerns a person's strengths and weaknesses, which can be used to treat the person better. Therapists should customize their treatment for each patient. Speech-language therapy (SLT) is the primary, evidence-based intervention used to improve communication skills after stroke and other brain injury; systematic reviews and randomized trials show SLT improves functional communication, expressive language, reading and writing outcomes compared with no therapy, although evidence specific to conduction-type aphasia is modest. There are no specific pharmacologic or surgical cures for conduction aphasia.

== History ==
In the late 19th century, Paul Broca studied people with expressive aphasia. These people had lesions in the anterior perisylvian region (now known as Broca's area), and produced halting and labored speech, lacking in function words and grammar.

For example:

Clinician: What brought you to the hospital?

Patient: yes ... ah ... Monday ... ah ... Dad ... Peter Hogan, and Dad ... ah ... hospital ... and ah ... Wednesday ... Wednesday ... nine o'clock and ah Thursday ... ten o'clock ... doctors two ... two ... an doctors and ... ah ... teeth ... yah ... and a doctor an girl ... and gums, an I.

Comprehension is generally preserved, although there can be deficits in interpretation of complex sentences. In an extreme example, one of his subjects could only produce a single syllable, "Tan".

Meanwhile, Carl Wernicke described a person with receptive aphasia, who had damage to the left posterior superior temporal lobe, which he named "the area of word images". These people could speak fluently, but their speech lacked meaning. They had a severe deficit in auditory comprehension.

The two disorders (expressive and receptive aphasias) thus seemed complementary, and corresponded to two distinct anatomical locations.

Wernicke predicted the existence of conduction aphasia in his landmark 1874 monograph, Der Aphasische Symptomenkompleks: Eine Psychologische Studie auf Anatomischer Basis. He was the first to distinguish the various aphasias in an anatomical framework, and proposed that a disconnection between the two speech systems (motor and sensory) would lead to a unique condition, distinct from both expressive and receptive aphasias, which he termed Leitungsaphasie. He did not explicitly predict the repetition deficit, but did note that, unlike those with Wernicke's aphasia, conduction aphasics would be able to comprehend speech properly, and intriguingly, would be able to hear and understand their own speech errors, leading to frustration and self-correction.

Wernicke was influenced by Theodor Meynert, his mentor, who postulated that aphasias were due to perisylvian lesions. Meynert also distinguished between the posterior and anterior language systems, leading Wernicke to localize the two regions. Wernicke's research into the fiber pathways connecting the posterior and anterior regions lead him to theorize that damage to the fibers under the insula would lead to conduction aphasia. Ludwig Lichtheim expanded on Wernicke's work, although he labeled the disorder commissural aphasia, to distinguish between aphasias tied to processing centers.

Sigmund Freud would argue in 1891 that the old framework was inaccurate; the entire perisylvian area, from the posterior to the anterior regions, were equivalent in facilitating speech function. In 1948 Kurt Goldstein postulated that spoken language was a central phenomenon, as opposed to a differentiated and disparate set of functionally distinct modules. To Freud and Goldstein, conduction aphasia was thus the result of a central, core language breakdown; Goldstein labeled the disorder central aphasia.

Later work and examination of brain structures, however, implicated the arcuate fasciculus, a white matter bundle connecting the posterior temporoparietal junction with the frontal cortex. Norman Geschwind proposed that damage to this bundle caused conduction aphasia; the characteristic deficits in auditory repetition were due to failed transmission of information between the two language centers. Studies showed that conduction aphasics had an intact 'inner voice', which discredited the central deficit model of Freud and Goldstein. The Wernicke-–Lichtheim–Geschwind disconnection hypothesis thus became the prevailing explanation for conduction aphasia. However, recent reviews and research have cast doubt on the singular role of the arcuate fasciculus and the model of spoken language in general.

== Role of Phonological Short-Term Memory ==
Research on conduction aphasia shows that many of the repetition problems arise from an impaired phonological short-term memory system. This system normally helps maintain sound-based information for a few seconds so it can be transformed into accurate speech output. Damage to the left supramarginal gyrus and posterior superior temporal regions disrupts this short-term maintenance process, making it difficult to hold onto the exact sequence of phonemes long enough to repeat words or sentences. Because of this deficit, longer or more complex phrases quickly exceed the limited phonological buffer, leading to phonemic paraphasias and multiple self-correction attempts. The preserved ability to paraphrase meaning, despite poor verbatim repetition, supports the idea that conduction aphasia reflects a breakdown in this sound-based memory system rather than a loss of conceptual understanding. Modern models therefore view conduction aphasia as a disorder of auditory–motor integration and phonological maintenance rather than a simple disconnection between Broca's and Wernicke's areas.

Studies comparing repetition tasks with naming and reading tasks have shown that the repetition deficit is not caused by problems in recognizing sounds, but rather in temporarily storing and manipulating phonological information. People with conduction aphasia often perform better when allowed to repeat slowly or break a word into smaller parts, which reduces the memory load. These patterns support the idea that a reduced phonological buffer contributes directly to repetition breakdowns in everyday communication.

Neuroimaging evidence also supports this account. Functional MRI and lesion-symptom mapping studies show that damage to the sensorimotor integration zone, particularly in the left posterior temporo-parietal cortex, disrupts the interface that links auditory representations to motor plans. When this interface is weakened, phonological information decays too quickly, resulting in errors during speech repetition even though comprehension and general fluency remain relatively intact. This aligns with modern models of language that emphasize distributed networks rather than isolated centers.

== See also ==
- Expressive aphasia
- Receptive aphasia
- Anomic aphasia
- Broca's area
- Wernicke's area
- Wernicke-Geschwind model
- Speech repetition
