= Uncinate fasciculus =

White matter tract in the human brain

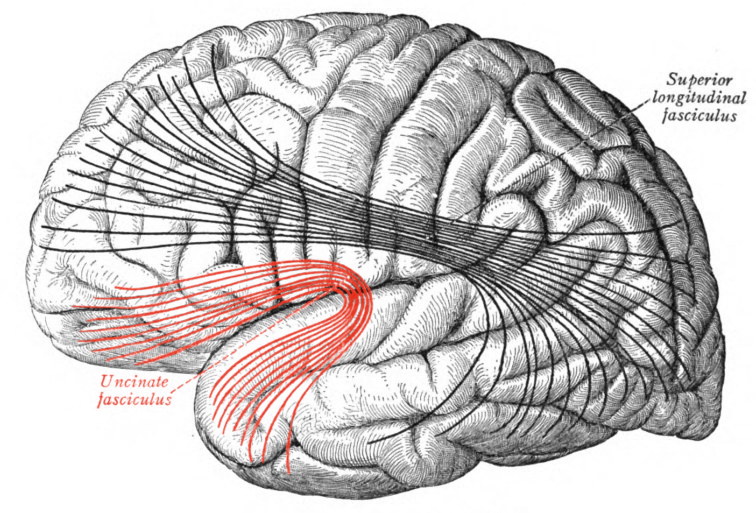
- Lateral surface of left cerebral hemisphere. Some of the major association tracts are depicted. Uncinate fasciculus is at lower left, in red.

- Tractography of the uncinate fasciculus.

Details

Identifiers
- Latin: fasciculus uncinatus
- MeSH: D000083382
- NeuroNames: 597
- NeuroLex ID: birnlex_983
- TA98: A14.1.09.560
- TA2: 5600
- FMA: 77636

The uncinate fasciculus is a white matter association tract in the human brain that connects parts of the limbic system such as the temporal pole, anterior parahippocampus, and amygdala in the temporal lobe with inferior portions of the frontal lobe such as the orbitofrontal cortex. Its function is unknown though it is affected in several psychiatric conditions. It is one of the last white matter tracts to mature in the human brain.

== Anatomy ==
The uncinate fasciculus is a hook-shaped bundle of axons that links anterior portions of the temporal lobe with the inferior frontal gyrus and the lower surfaces of the frontal lobe. It arises in the anterior temporal lobe and amygdala, in the temporal lobe curving in an upward pathway behind the external capsule inward of the insular cortex and continuing up into the posterior part of the orbital gyrus. It does not appear to have cell bodies in the hippocampus proper.

The average length of the uncinate fasciculus is 45 mm with a range 40–49 mm. Its volume in adults is 1425.9±138.6 mm^{3}, being slightly larger in men, at 1504.3±150.4, than women 1378.5±107.4.

It has three parts: a ventral or frontal extension, an intermediary segment called the isthmus or insular segment and a temporal or dorsal segment.

== Function ==
The uncinate fasciculus is a bi-directional pathway between the temporal lobe and frontal lobe; it is traditionally considered to be part of the limbic system. It has been proposed that the uncinate fasciculus allows mnemonic representations stored in the temporal lobe to interact with and guide decision making in the frontal lobe.

Diffusion tensor imaging, a reconstruction model available from a diffusion MRI scan, shows a greater fractional anisotropy on the left side than on the right. The difference in this measure of anisotropy has been linked to the left hemispheric specialization for language. However, the use of electrical brain stimulation upon it fails to disrupt language, suggesting it might not be involved in language, though it is possible that this disruption failed to happen because it was functionally compensated by alternative pathways.

The uncinate fasciculus appears to have a role in some, but not all, types of learning and memory. Reversal learning, in which a stimulus-reward association is learned over many trials, then reversed such that the initial stimulus is no longer is associated with a reward, is associated with individual variation in the uncinate fasciculus. In addition, the ability to learn associations through trial and error, such as the pairing of a name with a face, correlates with uncinate fasciculus microstructure. This relates to early work showing that surgical damage to the uncinate fasciculus is reliably associated with deficits in proper name retrieval. The uncinate fasciculus is also thought to be involved in retrieving the meaning of words from memory.

== Development ==
The uncinate fasciculus has the longest period of development in terms of fractional anisotropy as it alone amongst the major white fibre tracks continues to develop until the age of 30. Developmental disorders with core problems relating to memory retrieval, reward and valuation computation, and impulsive decision making may be linked to aberrations in uncinate fasciculus microstructure, e.g. temporal lobe epilepsy and conduct disorder.

Moreover it seems to be developmentally vulnerable. In 12-year-old males that were preterm, abnormalities measured by fractional anisotropy in the left anterior uncinate correlated with verbal IQ, full-scale IQ, and Peabody Picture Vocabulary Test-Revised scores. In 10-year-old children who have suffered socioemotional deprivation, the left uncinate fasciculus shows reduced fractional anisotropy compared to that in other children, and this might underlie their cognitive, socioemotional, and behavioral difficulties.

== Clinical significance ==
Abnormalities within the fiber bundles of the uncinate fasciculus have been linked to a host of neuropsychiatric disorders, some consistently, some inconsistently. For instance, studies of individuals with social anxiety and schizophrenia have reported changed in diffusion metrics of the uncinate. Unfortunately these findings frequently fail to replicate, the directionality of effects is mixed, and there is no specificity between findings in the uncinate and these particular diseases. An in-depth review of the clinical literature noted that "the uncinate fasciculus per se plays either a small role, or no role, in anxiety disorders " and that "the results of DTI studies measuring changes in uncinate fractional anisotropy values in schizophrenics are contradictory." Future researchers should focus on using superior diffusion imaging methods as well correlating specific symptoms, rather than presence or absence of disease state, with changes in white matter.

In contrast, microstructural changes to the uncinate fasciculus have been consistently been linked to conduct disorder and psychopathy. This is consistent with studies of gray matter volume which reported that neural regions linked by the uncinate fasciculus—the orbitofrontal cortex and temporal polar cortex/Brodmann area 38 (also known as the temporal pole/temporal polar cortex/anterior temporal lobe)— have decreased volume in individuals with antisocial personality disorder /psychopathy relative to control. Interestingly, Phineas Gage, a railroad worker who had an iron bar go through his left frontal lobe also sustained damage to the uncinate fasciculus. After the accident, his personality was radically transformed, becoming impulsive, making poor decisions, and failing to follow social norms and conventions. Last, consistent abnormalities in the uncinate fasciculus are found in Alzheimer's disease, semantic dementia, and temporal lobe epilepsy.

== Additional images ==
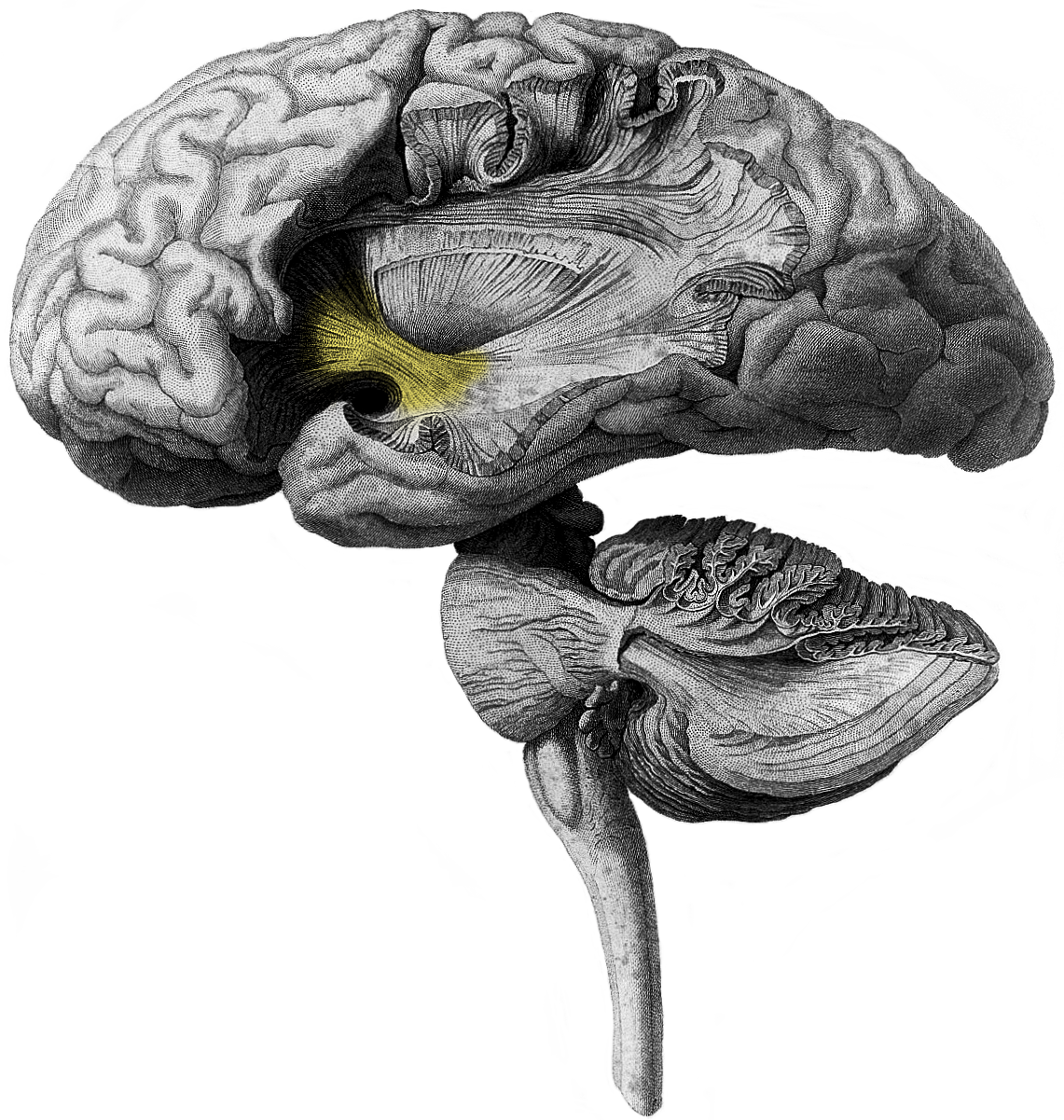
Human brain with operculum removed. A part of uncinate fasciculus is visible (shown in yellow)

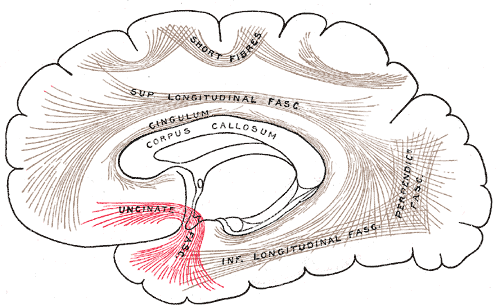
Diagram showing principal systems of association fibers in the cerebrum. (Uncinate fasc. visible at lower left, in red.)

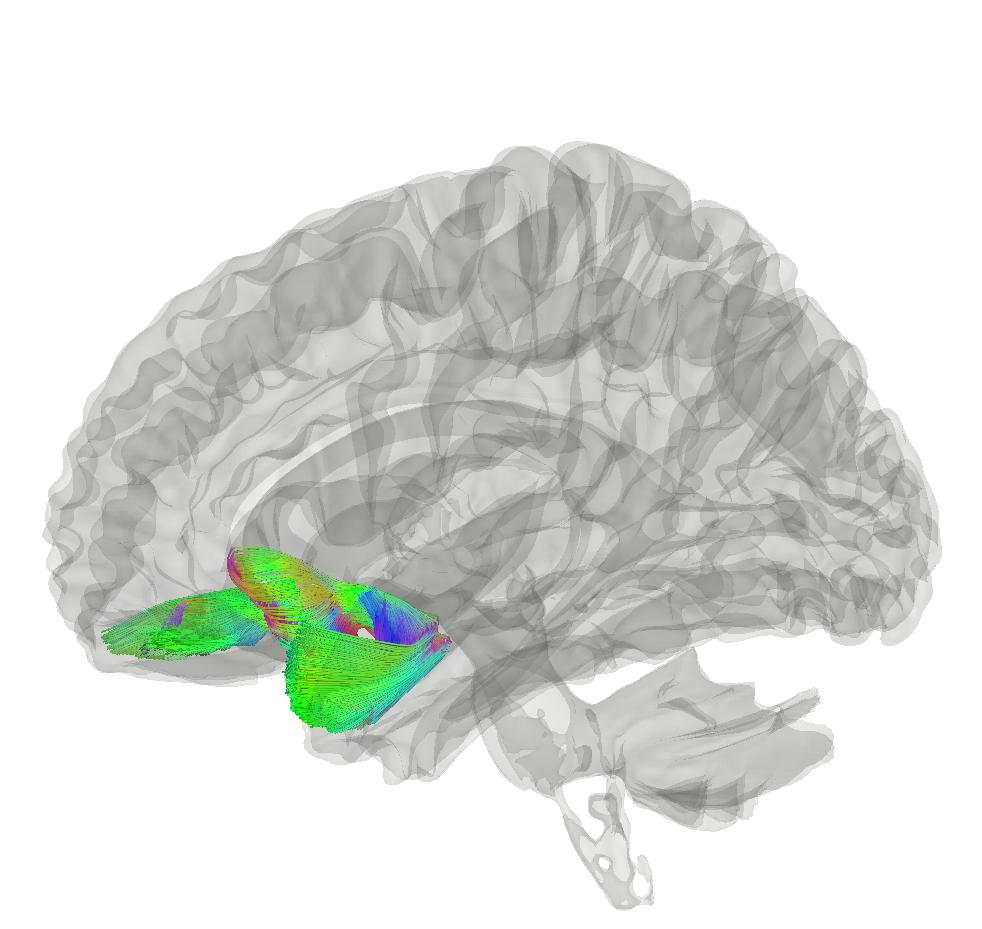
Tractography showing uncinate fasciculus.

Animation of tractography data. Blue is the left, green is the right.
