= Arcuate fasciculus =

Neural pathway connecting Broca's area and Wernicke's area

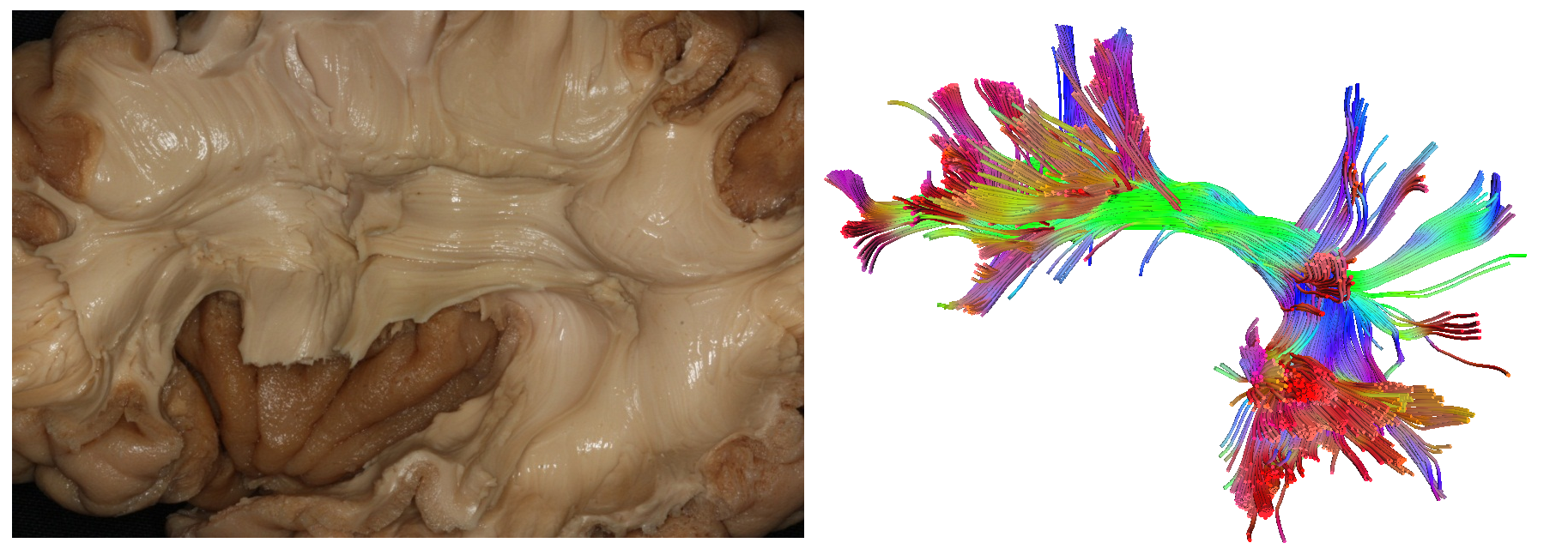
- The arcuate fasciculus connects two important areas for language use, Broca's area and Wernicke's area.

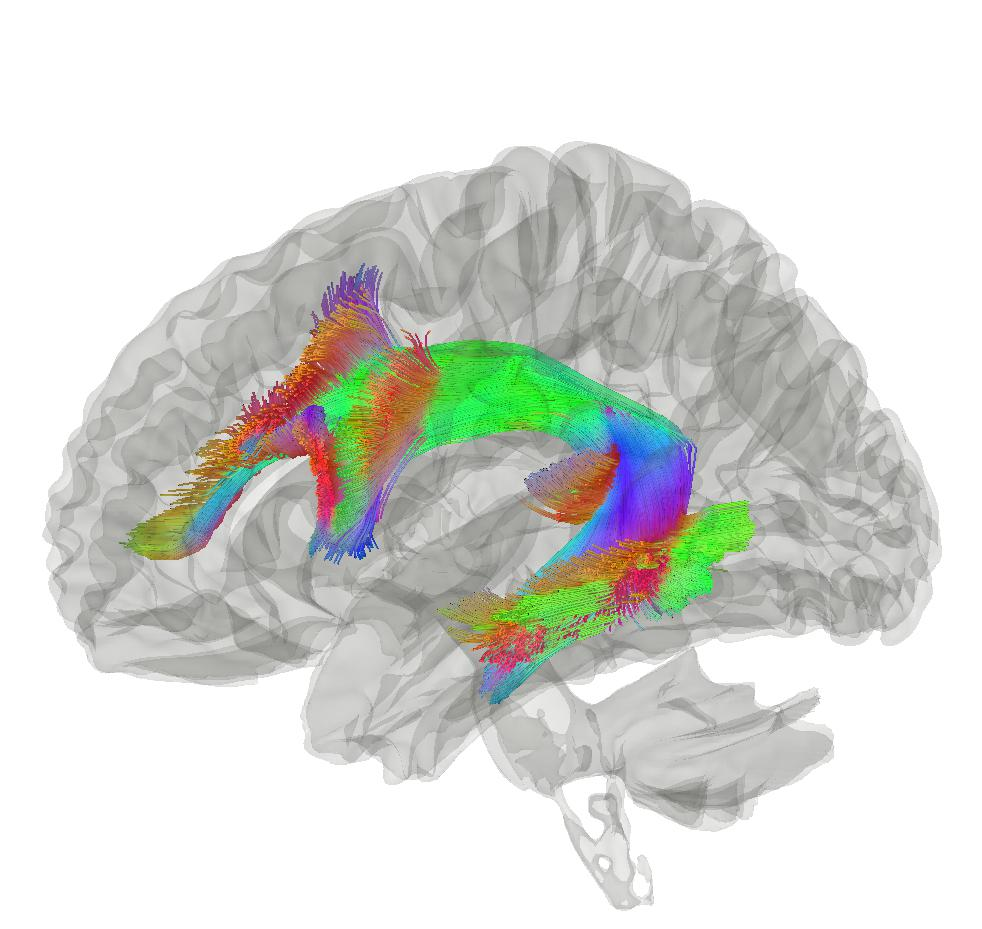
- Tractography showing arcuate fasciculus

Details
- From: Broca's area of the frontal lobe
- To: Wernicke's area of the temporal lobe

Identifiers
- Latin: fasciculus arcuatus
- TA98: A14.1.09.557
- TA2: 5599
- FMA: 260714

In neuroanatomy, the arcuate fasciculus (AF; from Latin 'curved bundle') is a bundle of axons that generally connects Broca's area and Wernicke's area in the brain. It is an association fiber tract connecting caudal temporal lobe and inferior frontal lobe.

== Structure ==
The arcuate fasciculus is a white matter tract that runs parallel to the superior longitudinal fasciculus. Due to their proximity, they are sometimes referred to interchangeably. They can be distinguished by the location and function of their endpoints in the frontal cortex. The arcuate fasciculus terminates in Broca's area (specifically BA 44) which is linked to processing complex syntax. However, the superior longitudinal fasciculus ends in the premotor cortex which is implicated in acoustic-motor mapping.

=== Connection ===
Historically, the arcuate fasciculus has been understood to connect two important areas for language use: Broca's area in the inferior frontal gyrus and Wernicke's area in the posterior superior temporal gyrus. It is mostly considered to be an oversimplification, but this model is still utilized because a satisfactory replacement has not been developed. The topographical relationships between independent measures of white matter and gray matter integrity suggest that rich developmental or environmental interactions influence brain structure and function. The presence and strength of such associations may elucidate pathophysiological processes influencing systems such as language and motor planning.

As the technique of diffusion MRI has improved, this has become a testable hypothesis. Research indicates more diffuse termination of the fibers of the arcuate than previously thought. While the main caudal source of the fiber tract appears to be posterior superior temporal cortex, the rostral terminations are mostly in premotor cortex, part of Brodmann area 44.

=== Developmental differences ===
Myelination is a process by which axons are covered with a protective substance called myelin that drastically increases the signaling efficiency of the neuron. The arcuate fasciculus is heavily myelinated in healthy adult brains. The density of this myelination has been found to predict the accuracy and speed to which one can comprehend sentences and alterations in structure can impact receptive language abilities. However, the arcuate fasciculus of newborns is unmyelinated. The myelination process occurs gradually during childhood; myelin density has been shown to increase between the age of 3 and 10. A study comparing a group of 6-year-olds to a group of 3-year-olds found that the 6-year-olds had stronger functional connectivity of the arcuate fasciculus. The arcuate fasciculus is similarly undeveloped in non-human primates such as chimpanzees and macaques. This supports the theory that the arcuate fasciculus is a critical component in language.

=== Dorsal stream ===
The two-streams hypothesis of language proposes that there are two streams by which the brain processes language information: the dorsal and ventral streams. The basis of this model is generally accepted, however the details of it are highly contentious. The dorsal pathway consists of multiple fiber tracts, one of which is the arcuate fasciculus. The dorsal pathway as a whole is implicated in sensory-to-motor mapping and processing complex syntax.

== Role in language ==
=== Syntax ===
Syntax refers to a set of rules by which we order words within a language. Some researchers argue that syntax is what distinguishes language as a uniquely human capacity. Though the exact function of the arcuate fasciculus is still debated, the predominant theory is that it is involved with processing complex sequences of syntax. Studies indicate that as the arcuate fasciculus matures and undergoes myelination, there is a corresponding increase in the ability to process syntax. Furthermore, lesions in the arcuate fasciculus often result in difficulties with syntax. Researchers have found that when subjects are confronted with difficult syntactic structures, there is high synchronicity between the left frontal and parietal regions due to their connection by the arcuate fasciculus. This research further supports the arcuate fasciculus as the key component of human language.

=== Lateralization ===
The arcuate fasciculus is a bilateral structure; this means that it is present in both the right and left hemispheres of the brain. These fiber tracts are asymmetrical; the left arcuate fasciculus is stronger than the right. While the left arcuate fasciculus is thought to be the one involved with syntax processing, the right arcuate fasciculus has been implicated in prosody processing. Studies further suggest that the right arcuate fasciculus is involved with the ability to read emotion from human facial expression.

== Clinical significance ==
=== Conduction aphasia ===
Historically the arcuate fasciculus has been linked to conduction aphasia, which is usually the result of damage to the inferior parietal lobule that extends into the subcortical white matter and compromises the arcuate fasciculus. This type of aphasia is characterized by difficulty with repetition and prevalent phonemic paraphasias. Patients otherwise exhibit a relatively normal control of language. The symptoms of conduction aphasia suggest that the connection between the posterior temporal cortex and frontal cortex plays a vital role in short-term memory of words and speech sounds that are new or have just been heard. The arcuate fasciculus is the main connection between these two regions. Studies that challenge the claim that the arcuate fasciculus is responsible for repetition cite that in some cases lesions to the arcuate fasciculus nor total agenesis produce conduction aphasia.

=== Progressive aphasia ===
Progressive aphasia is a type of aphasia that slowly worsens over time. It can affect both the production and comprehension of language. Progressive aphasic patients that have lesions in their arcuate fasciculus were especially deficient in their syntax processing abilities. Worsened syntax processing correlated with the degree of degradation in the arcuate fasciculus.

=== Tone deafness ===
In nine out of ten people with tone deafness, the superior arcuate fasciculus in the right hemisphere could not be detected, suggesting a disconnection between the posterior superior temporal gyrus and the posterior inferior frontal gyrus. Researchers suggested the posterior superior temporal gyrus was the origin of the disorder.

=== Stuttering ===
In stutterers, the arcuate fasciculus appears to have bilateral deficits that reduce it by one-third or more relative to non-stutterers. However, there is ongoing debate concerning the contribution of each hemisphere. Difussion-weighted MRI shows the difference between stutterers and controls is not isolated to the arcuate fasciculus.

=== Specific language impairment ===
Specific language impairment is a disorder that prevents children from developing language normally. These children particularly have difficulty with the syntactic and hierarchal structures of language. Damage to the arcuate fasciculus is implicated as a possible cause of specific language impairment, however further data is required to validate this claim.

=== Dyslexia ===
Dyslexia is a disorder that is primarily characterized by reading deficits. Research has shown that decreases in the integrity of the arcuate fasciculus coincide with worsened reading ability in dyslexic subjects.

== Evolution ==
The connection by the arcuate fasciculus between the superior temporal gyrus (STG) and the middle temporal gyrus (MTG) is considered essential for the processing of syntactically and semantically complex sentences. While the neural connection linking the arcuate fasciculus to the STG is clearly visible in other primates, the connection linking it to the MTG has long been observed only in humans, supporting the hypothesis of a morphological differentiation in the human lineage that gave rise to language.

In 2025, analysis of MRI images of twenty chimpanzee brains revealed the existence of an arcuate fasciculus - MTG connection, albeit less prominent than in humans. The evolution of this connection therefore dates back more than 7 million years, the estimated age of the separation of the two lineages.

== See also ==
- Wernicke–Geschwind model
