= Philip Batchelor =

British mathematician

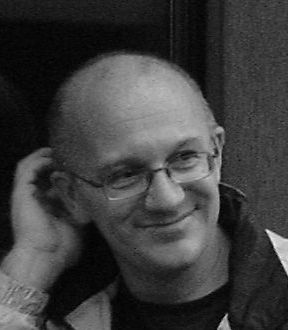
Philip Batchelor

Philip Batchelor (30 December 1967 in St Austell, Cornwall, UK – 30 August 2011 near Annecy, France), was a Swiss-British academic in the fields of mathematics and medical imaging.

== Life ==
Batchelor was born in St Austell, Cornwall and grew up in Vouvry, a village in Switzerland. He graduated from ETH Zurich with a Masters in Theoretical Physics in 1992 and continued studying in Zurich for a PhD in Mathematics, which he obtained in 1997. In 1998, Batchelor joined United Medical and Dental School, which later became part of King's College London (KCL), to work on the application of mathematical principles to magnetic resonance imaging (MRI) at Guy's Hospital. He rapidly made an impact by employing concepts from differential geometry to study folding and curvature in the developing human brain. In 2005 he moved to the Centre for Medical Image Computing at University College London, and was appointed a Senior Lecturer in the Imaging Sciences Division at KCL in 2006.

He gained a reputation for an ability to get to the heart of the issue and to draw in knowledge from other areas. A good example of this came during his work on diffusion tensor imaging (DTI). In trying to quantify the shapes of fibre tracts seen in DTI, he found measures that focussed on shape, not brain size. Furthermore, these measures were inspired from such varied fields as torsion and polymer structure analysis and even the orbits of asteroids. In 2002, the choice of which diffusion gradient directions to acquire in diffusion tensor imaging was the subject of debate in the literature, with various empirical approaches having been proposed. At its core, this was a problem that combined the geometry related to the equal distribution of points on a hemisphere (the diffusion directions) and the diffusion-attenuated signal in MRI. Batchelor showed why direction schemes based on icosahedral shapes are optimal, and provided proof that the noise propagation in these icosahedral direction schemes was closely related to the best that could ever be done by acquiring an infinite number of directions.

There was also the issue of how to manipulate the tensor data from DTI. In one of his most highly cited papers, Batchelor provided a rigorous framework that showed how to measure the geodesic distance between tensors (always maintaining an ellipsoid shape), how to average them, how to perform interpolation and rotation and he devised a metric called the geodesic anisotropy – an alternative to the commonly used fractional anisotropy measure.

Another key insight came from considering the key problem of how to correct non-rigid liver motion in MRI. Batchelor had the insight that this highly non-linear process could nonetheless be expressed concisely and in a general form using matrices. This has opened the field of non-rigid motion correction in MRI (e.g.).

Batchelor was a committed teacher and was always willing to patiently assist his colleagues and students with tutorials in mathematics. He recognised the need for education within the medical imaging academic community and in 2007 he organised a highly successful "Maths for Medical Imaging" summer school, which has since formed the basis of an ongoing component of the King's College Medical Physics MSc.

His scope of research extended further including the visionary aim of producing diffusion tensor reconstructions of the beating heart. He and his group were the first to present 3D fibre images of the in-vivo heart of humans. Compressed sensing also attracted his interest more recently. The work on k–t group sparse methods has significantly pushed the acceleration limits for dynamic MRI of the heart and lung. He co-authored a number of other papers.

His characteristics of getting to the heart of the problem and bringing in fresh ideas were mirrored in his personality. Philip did not work for personal gain, he was open and selfless – committed to open source software and free access publishing. He was a skilled climber and loved mountain sports. He died in a climbing accident on 30 August 2011.

== Memorial Symposium ==
On 19 September 2012 a symposium was held in honour of Philip Batchelor's achievements. The symposium was open to everyone who knew Batchelor, professionally or personally, and to those familiar with his work. During his London-based career in medical imaging, Batchelor worked with many researchers from around the world. The symposium consisted of a series of lectures presenting the current state of the art research in the various areas to which Batchelor made significant contributions.

Details of the talks given at the symposium can be found on the Philip Batchelor Memorial Symposium page on the King's College London (Division of Imaging Sciences and Biomedical Engineering) website.
