= Inferior longitudinal fasciculus =

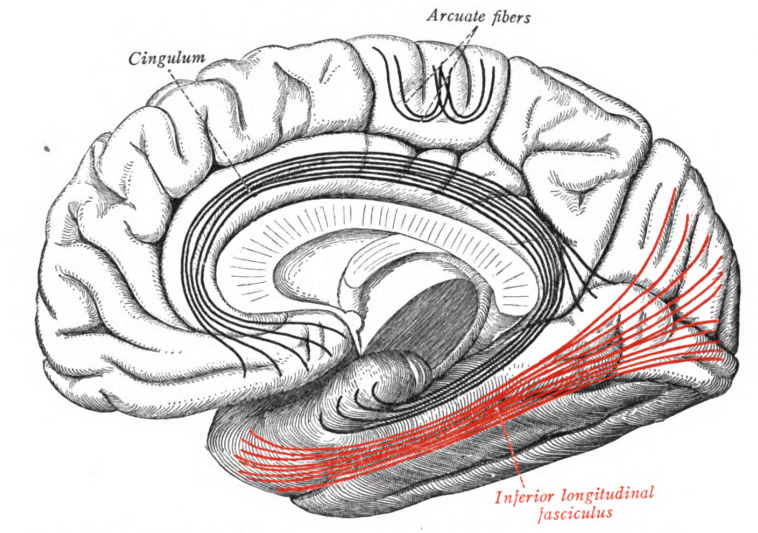
- Medial surface of right cerebral hemisphere. Some of major association tracts are depicted. Inferior longitudinal fasciculus labeled at bottom right, in red.

- Tractography showing inferior longitudinal fasciculus.

Details

Identifiers
- Latin: fasciculus longitudinalis inferior cerebri
- NeuroNames: 1443
- TA98: A14.1.09.556
- TA2: 5598
- FMA: 77632

The inferior longitudinal fasciculus (ILF) is traditionally considered one of the major occipitotemporal association tracts. It is the white matter backbone of the ventral visual stream. It connects the ventral surface of the anterior temporal lobe and the extrastriate cortex of the occipital lobe, running along the lateral and inferior wall of the lateral ventricle.

The existence of this fasciculus and its anatomical description have been the subject of several mutually conflicting studies. Some authors denied its existence because of the unclear results obtained in non-human brains.

Using diffusion tensor imaging (DTI), several authors have confirmed the presence of this constant longitudinal pathway in humans.

Some other studies of the ILF based on Klingler's dissection method (a type of white matter blunt dissection, providing reliable data on the anatomy of major fibre bundles and, in some cases, additional tractography not only confirmed the classical descriptions of the direct connection between occipital and temporal regions but also sought to detail the subcomponents of this association tract.

Four branches were consistently identified: a fusiform branch connecting the fusiform gyrus to the anterior temporal regions; a dorsolateral occipital branch connecting the superior, middle and inferior occipital gyri to the anterior temporal regions; a lingual branch connecting the lingual gyrus to the anterior part of the middle temporal gyrus; and a minor cuneal branch connecting the cuneus to the anterior mesial temporal gyri.

== Functions of the ILF ==
Summarising studies from healthy individuals, intraoperative and lesional findings, this white matter bundle supports functions linked to the ventral visual stream such as object recognition and face perception, Likewise, disorders linked to this white matter tract are disorders with perturbed visual perception such as associative visual agnosia, prosopagnosia, visual amnesia, visual hypo-emotionality; but also some forms of autism spectrum disorders, schizophrenia and alexia.

ILF supports brain functions concerning the visual modality, including object, face and place processing, reading, lexical and semantic processing, emotion processing, and visual memory. Based on these recent findings ILF can be described as a multi-functional white matter pathway involved in visually guided behavior (See Herbet et al. for review). It can also be described as a fiber tract with dual-function in both the language and limbic systems (See Kamali et al. for review).
