= Cingulum (brain) =

Nerve tract from the cingulate gyrus to the entorhinal cortex in the brain

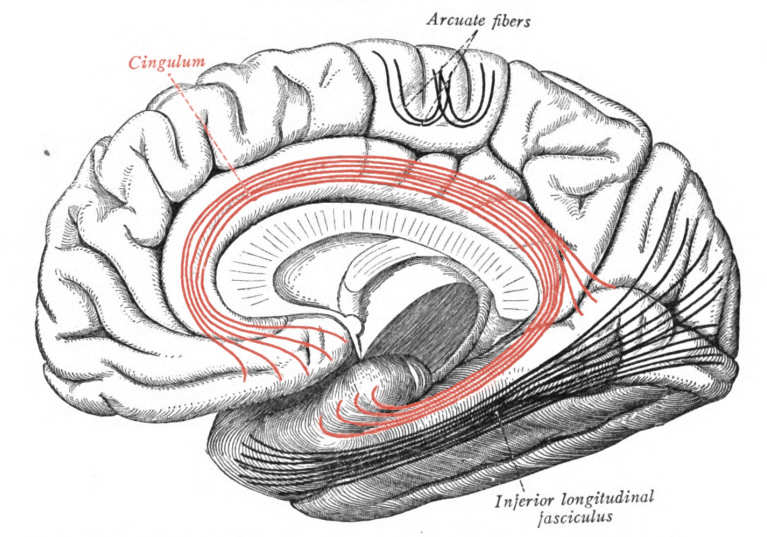
- Medial surface of right cerebral hemisphere. Some of major association tracts are depicted. Cingulum is at center, in red.

- Tractography of cingulum. Animation.

Details

Identifiers
- Latin: cingulum
- NeuroNames: 1445
- TA98: A14.1.09.555; A05.1.03.044
- TA2: 5597
- FMA: 260761

In neuroanatomy, the cingulum or cingulum bundle is an association tract, a nerve tract that projects from the cingulate gyrus to the entorhinal cortex in the brain, allowing for communication between components of the limbic system. It forms the white matter core of the cingulate gyrus, following it from the subcallosal gyrus of the frontal lobe beneath the rostrum of corpus callosum to the parahippocampal gyrus and uncus of the temporal lobe.

Neurons of the cingulum receive afferent fibers from the parts of the thalamus that are associated with the spinothalamic tract. This, in addition to the fact that the cingulum is a central structure in learning to correct mistakes, indicates that the cingulum is involved in appraisal of pain and reinforcement of behavior that reduces it.

Cingulotomy, the surgical severing of the anterior cingulum, is a form of psychosurgery used to treat depression and OCD.

The cingulum was one of the earliest identified brain structures.

== Anatomy and function ==
The cingulum is described from various brain images as a C-shaped structure within the brain that wraps around the frontal lobe to the temporal lobe right above the corpus callosum. It is located beneath the cingulate gyrus within the medial surface of the brain therefore encircling the entire brain. There are two primary parts of the cingulate cortex: the posterior cingulate cortex and the anterior cingulate cortex. The anterior is linked to emotion, especially apathy and depression. Here function and structure changes are related meaning any change within this structure would lead to a function change, particularly behavioral because of its function involving emotions. Damage to this area can have various effects on mental disorders and mental health. The posterior section is more related to cognitive functions. This can include attention, visual and spatial skills, working memory and general memory. Because of its location, the cingulum is very important to brain structure connectivity and the integration of information that it receives.

The cingulum bundle also connects multiple language centers in the brain, including the dorsolateral prefrontal cortex, supplementary motor area, and the superior parietal lobule, which suggests it plays a role in language. It is involved in procedural and declarative memory, and damage to the cingulum bundle is linked to developmental language disorders.

== Relation to cognitive impairment ==
In recent years the cingulum has been associated with various brain disorders and diseases. One such area of interest is the disruption of white matter in the posterior cingulum causing mild cognitive impairment. Using diffusion MRI techniques, researchers have associated mild cognitive impairment with damage to the cingulum. The cingulum is a frontal association tract that could play a critical role because it connects sites repeatedly implicated in cognitive control. The middle segment of the cingulum contains connections with premotor and motor cortical areas. Another place of importance that explains the cingulum and its relation to mild cognitive impairment is the fact that the cingulum connects to the hippocampus. The cingulum takes memory information and integrates this to other parts of the brain. Damage to the cingulum also simultaneously damages the hippocampus. This is vital because the hippocampus is pivotal in memory storage. Damage to gray matter, bodies of neurons, or white matter of axons in the cingulum therefore can affect humans cognitively because of this damage. Also variations in microstructure of a group of fibers in the rostral cingulum have been shown to be extremely sensitive to performance of cognitive control tasks. White matter pathology of the cingulum represents one of the earliest changes in development of age-related dementia and is currently aiding researchers worldwide to discover more about this relationship.

== Additional images ==
Human brain dissection video (54 sec). Demonstrating the position of the cingulum.

One way to subdivide the cingulum. In this animation, the cingulum is divided into the five components.

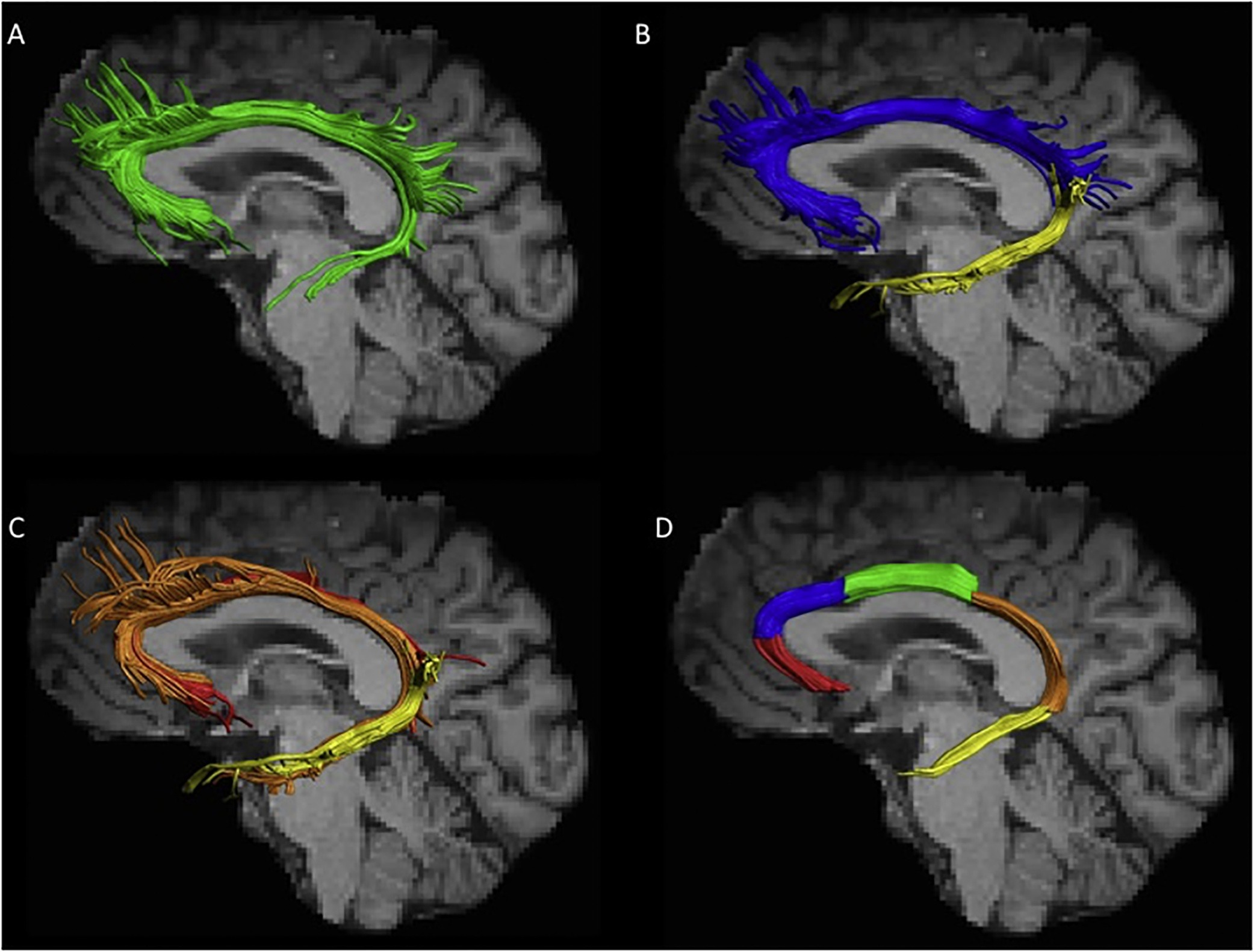
There are various ways to subdivide cingulum. From figure A to D, dividing the cingulum into 1, 2, 3, and 5 components respectively.
