= Longitudinal fasciculus =

Longitudinal fasciculus may refer to:

- Dorsal longitudinal fasciculus
- Inferior longitudinal fasciculus
- Medial longitudinal fasciculus
