= Association fiber =

Axons that connect cortical areas within the same cerebral hemisphere

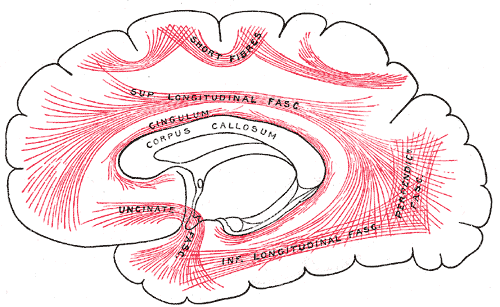
- Diagram showing principal systems of association fibers in the cerebrum.

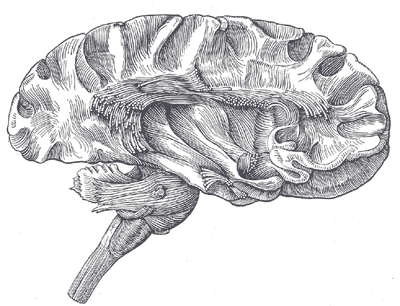
- Dissection of cerebral cortex and brainstem showing association fibers and insular cortex after removal of its superficial grey matter

Details

Identifiers
- Latin: fibrae associationis telencephali
- TA98: A14.1.00.016; A14.1.09.553
- TA2: 5593
- FMA: 75241

Association fibers are axons (nerve fibers) that connect cortical areas within the same cerebral hemisphere.

In human neuroanatomy, axons within the brain, can be categorized on the basis of their course and connections as association fibers, projection fibers, and commissural fibers. Bundles of fibers are known as nerve tracts, and consist of association tracts, commissural tracts, and projection tracts.

The association fibers unite different parts of the same cerebral hemisphere, and are of two kinds: (1) short association fibers that connect adjacent gyri; (2) long association fibers that make connections between more distant parts.

== Short association fibers ==
Many of the short association fibers (also called arcuate or "U"-fibers) lie in the superficial white matter immediately beneath the gray matter of the cerebral cortex, and connect together adjacent gyri. Some pass from one wall of the sulcus to the other.

== Long association fibers ==
The long association fibers connect the more widely separated gyri and are grouped into bundles. They include the following:

Name	From	To
uncinate fasciculus	frontal lobe	temporal lobe
cingulum	cingulate gyrus	entorhinal cortex
superior longitudinal fasciculus	frontal lobe	occipital lobe
inferior longitudinal fasciculus	occipital lobe	temporal lobe
vertical occipital fasciculus	inferior parietal lobule	fusiform gyrus
occipitofrontal fasciculus	occipital lobe	frontal lobe
Arcuate fasciculus	frontal lobe	temporal lobe

Diffusion tensor imaging is a non-invasive method to study the course of association fibers.

== See also ==
- Interneuron
- Tractography
