= Centrum semiovale =

Area of white matter below the human brain's central cortex

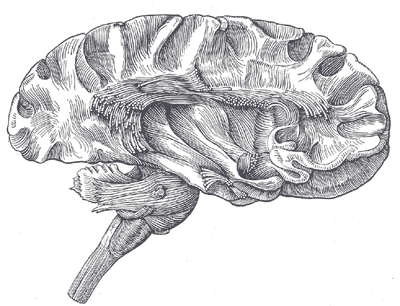
- Dissection of cortex and brain-stem showing association fibers and island of Reil after removal of its superficial gray substance.

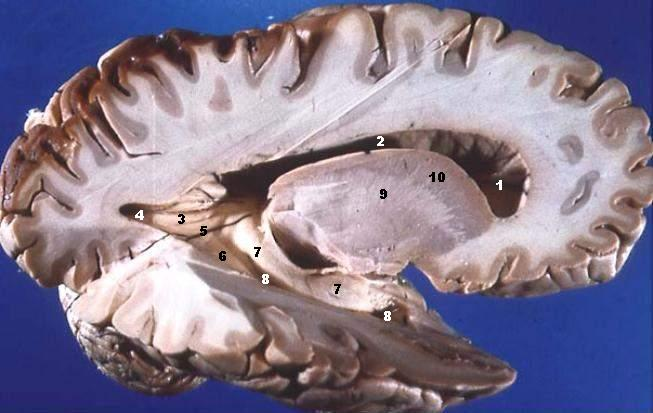
- Human brain right dissected lateral view description

Details

Identifiers
- Latin: centrum semiovale
- NeuroNames: 190
- TA2: 5574
- FMA: 61939

In neuroanatomy, the centrum semiovale, semioval center or centrum ovale is the central area of white matter found underneath the cerebral cortex. The white matter, located in each hemisphere between the cerebral cortex and nuclei, as a whole has a semioval shape. It consists of cortical projection fibers, association fibers and cortical fibers. It continues ventrally as the corona radiata.
