= White matter dissection =

Anatomical technique

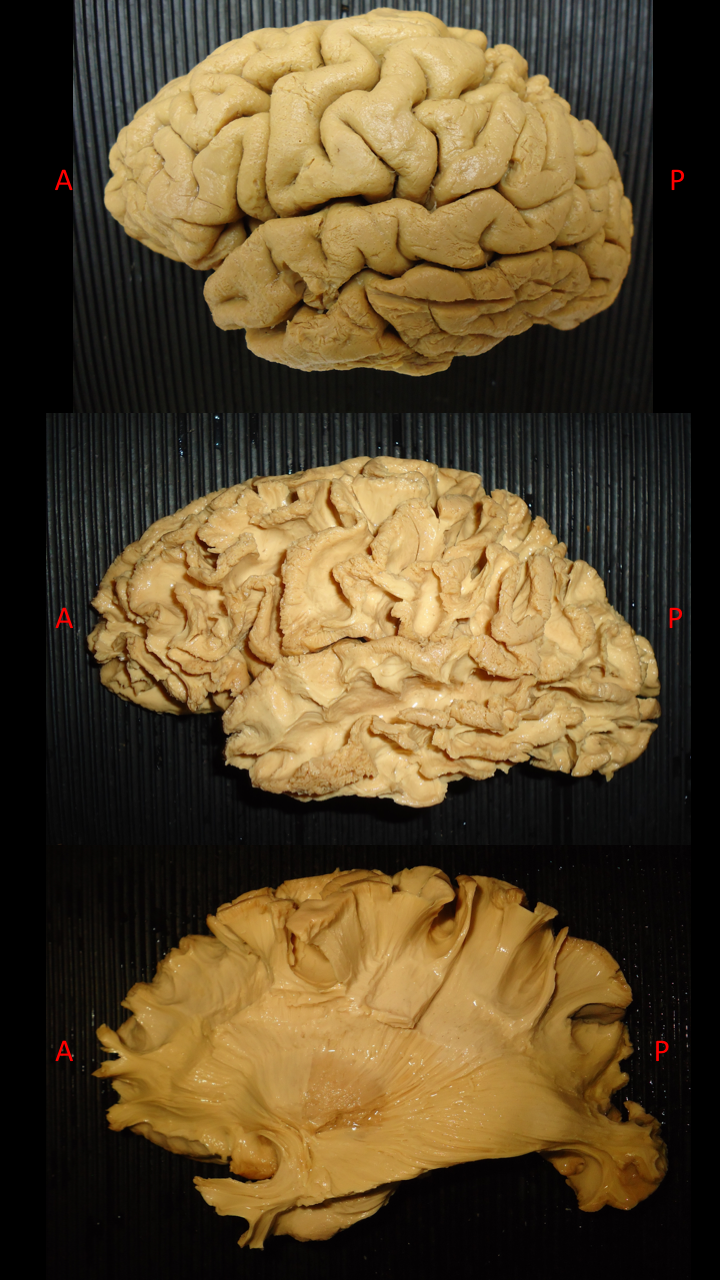
The picture shows three exemplary steps during white matter dissection. In the upper part, a left hemisphere has been prepared according to Klingler's technique. The arachnoidal layer and the blood vessels were previously removed. In the middle part of the picture the first step of white matter dissection with the exposure of short fibres (U-fibres) which are visible underneath the cerebral cortex. In the lower part, a deeper layer of anatomical dissection with white matter structures (associative and projection fibres) and basal ganglia (Putamen).

White matter dissection refers to a special anatomical technique able to reveal the subcortical organization of white matter fibers in the human or animal cadaver brain.

The first studies of cerebral white matter (WM) were described by Galen and by the subsequent efforts of Vesalius on human cadaver specimens. The interest for the deep anatomy of the brain pushed anatomist during centuries to create and develop different techniques for specimen preparation and dissection in order to better reveal the complex white matter architectural organization.

However, the biggest impact on the dissection of white matter anatomy was made by Joseph Klingler who developed a new method for specimens preparation and dissection. This technique became more feasible and widely used due to an increased quality of dissection and surprising quality of anatomical details. Klingler developed a new method of brain fixation, by freezing already formalin-fixed brains before dissection. First, the water crystallization induced by freezing disrupts the structure of the grey matter (which has a high water content). This process made possible to peel off the cortex from the brain surface without damaging the subcortical white matter organization underneath. Second, the freezing process along the WM fibers, induced a clear separation between them facilitating the dissection by progressive peeling of the fibers.

White matter fibre dissection is nowadays considered as a valuable tool to enhance our knowledge about brain connectivity, and has been used to validate tractographic results and vice versa with good consistency between the two techniques, but also for neurosurgical training and neuroanatomical teaching.
