= Superior longitudinal fasciculus =

Association fiber tract of the brain

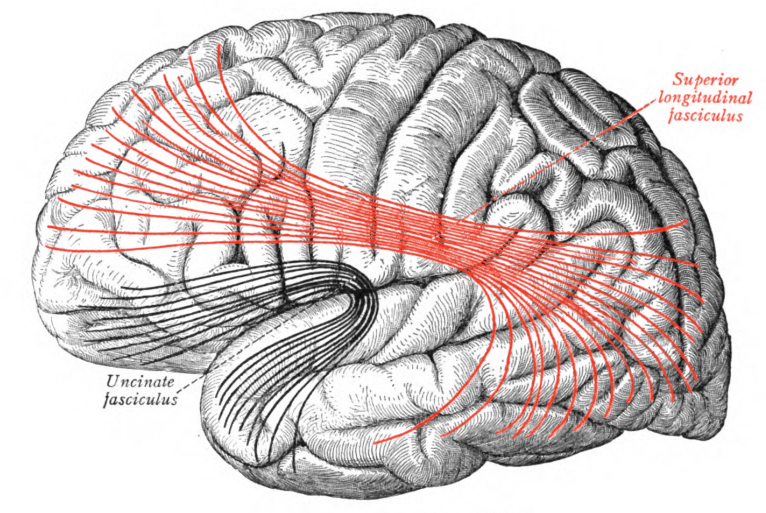
- Lateral surface of left cerebral hemisphere. Some of major association tracts are depicted. Superior longitudinal fasciculus is at center, in red.

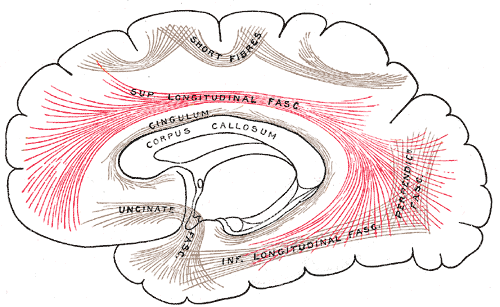
- Diagram showing principal systems of association fibers in the cerebrum. (Sup. longitudinal fasc. labeled at center top.)

Details

Identifiers
- Latin: fasciculus longitudinalis superior cerebri
- NeuroNames: 2080
- TA98: A14.1.09.557
- TA2: 5599
- FMA: 77631

The superior longitudinal fasciculus (SLF) is an association tract in the brain that is composed of three separate components. It is present in both hemispheres and can be found lateral to the centrum semiovale and connects the frontal, occipital, parietal, and temporal lobes. This bundle of tracts (fasciculus) passes from the frontal lobe through the operculum to the posterior end of the lateral sulcus where they either radiate to and synapse on neurons in the occipital lobe, or turn downward and forward around the putamen and then radiate to and synapse on neurons in anterior portions of the temporal lobe.

The SLF is composed of three distinct components SLF I, SLF II, and SLF III.

== SLF I ==
SLF I is the dorsal component and originates in the superior and medial parietal cortex, passes around the cingulate sulcus and in the superior parietal and frontal white matter, and terminates in the dorsal and medial cortex of the frontal lobe (Brodmann 6, 8, and 9) and in the supplementary motor cortex (M II).

SLF I connects to the superior parietal cortex which encodes locations of body parts in a body-centric coordinate system and with M II and dorsal premotor cortex. This suggests the SLF I is involved with regulating motor behavior, especially conditional associative tasks which select among competing motor tasks based on conditional rules.

== SLF II ==
SLF II is the major component of SLF and originates in the caudal-inferior parietal cortex and terminates in the dorsolateral prefrontal cortex (Brodmann 6, 8 and 46).

SLF II connects to the caudal inferior parietal cortex which controls spatial attention and visual and oculomotor functions. This suggests the SLF II provides the prefrontal cortex with parietal cortex information regarding perception of visual space. Since these bundles are bi-directional, working memory (Brodmann 46) in the prefrontal cortex may provide the parietal cortex with information to focus spatial attention and regulate selection and retrieval of spatial information.

Some research suggests a larger SLF II volumes in the "right hemisphere corresponded to faster detection times in the left hemifield". An hemispheric specialization that "is associated with an unbalanced speed of visuospatial processing along the SLF II. This lateralization may be predictive of visuospatial recovery in patients with lesions of parietofrontal networks."

== SLF III ==
SLF III is the ventral component and originates in the supramarginal gyrus (rostral portion of the inferior parietal lobe) and terminates in the ventral premotor and prefrontal cortex (Brodmann 6, 44, and 46).

SLF III connects the rostral inferior parietal cortex which receives information from the ventral precentral gyrus. This suggests that the SLF III transfers somatosensory information, such as language articulation, between the ventral premotor cortex, Brodmann 44 (pars opercularis), the supramarginal gyrus (Brodmann 40), and the laterial inferior prefrontal cortex working memory (Brodmann 46).
