= Boston Diagnostic Aphasia Examination =

- Purpose: evaluate adults suspected of having aphasia,

The Boston Diagnostic Aphasia Examination is a neuropsychological battery used to evaluate adults suspected of having aphasia, and is currently in its third edition. It was created by Harold Goodglass and Edith Kaplan. The exam evaluates language skills based on perceptual modalities (auditory, visual, and gestural), processing functions (comprehension, analysis, problem-solving), and response modalities (writing, articulation, and manipulation). Administration time ranges from 20 to 45 minutes for the shortened version but it can last up to 120 minutes for the extended version of the assessment. There are five subtests which include: conversational & expository speech, auditory comprehension, oral expression, reading, and writing. In the extended version all questions are asked while in the shortened version only a few questions are asked within each subtest. Many other tests are sometimes used by neurologists and speech language pathologists on a case-by-case basis, and other comprehensive tests exist like the Western Aphasia Battery.

== Description ==
The Boston Diagnostic Aphasia Examination provides a comprehensive exploration of a range of communicative abilities. Its results are used to classify patient's language profiles into one of the localization based classifications of aphasia: Broca's, Wernicke's, anomic, conduction, transcortical, transcortical motor, transcortical sensory, and global aphasia syndromes, although the test does not always provide a diagnosis or a therapeutic approach. The assessment provides a severity rating. The Examination is designed to go beyond simple functional definitions of aphasia into the components of language dysfunctions (symptoms) that have been shown to underlie the various aphasic syndromes. Thus, this test evaluates various perceptual modalities (e.g., auditory, visual, and gestural), processing functions (e.g., comprehension, analysis, problem-solving), and response modalities (e.g., writing, articulation, and manipulation). This approach allows for the neuropsychological analysis and measurement of language-related skills and abilities from both ideographic and nomothetic bases, as well as a comprehensive approach to the symptom configurations that relate to neuropathologic conditions. The test is divided into five subtests and include assessment of conversation and expository speech (simple social responses, free conversation, and picture description), auditory comprehension (at the word-level, sentence level, and complex ideational material), oral expression (automatized sequences, repetition, and naming), reading (basic symbol recognition, number matching, word identification-picture-word matching, oral reading, and reading comprehension), and writing (mechanics, encoding skills, written picture naming, and narrative writing).

=== Scoring ===
The manual provides clear statements and rules for scoring protocols. Once the scores are collected, the examiner completes the Summary of Scores and inserts them into the Summary Profile of Standard Subtests in the Boston Diagnostic Aphasia Examination Record Booklet to get percentiles. The percentiles are listed as 0, 10, 20, 30, 40, 50, 60, 70, 80, 90, and 100 only. The scores that are collected are a tally of the number of correct responses, the number of cues given, number of phonemic cues, etc.

=== Reliability ===
Reliability of the subtests was studied by selecting protocols of 34 patients with a degree of severity of aphasia ranging from slight to severe. Kuder-Richardson reliability coefficients for subtests ranged from 0.68 to 0.98, with about two-thirds of the coefficients reported ranging from 0.90 upwards. Since test-retest reliability is difficult if not impossible to attain in patients with aphasic symptoms, the current reliability coefficients demonstrate good internal consistency in terms of what the items within the subtests are measuring.

=== Validity ===
Validity: A discriminant analysis comparing "unambiguous exemplars of a single syndrome" was carried out. Thus, unambiguous cases of Broca's aphasia, Wernicke's aphasia, conduction aphasia, and anomic aphasia were selected. Ten variables were selected on the assumption of providing the most useful data. From these, five variables were selected for the discriminant analysis (body part identification, repetition of high probability sentences, verbal paraphasias, articulatory agility rating, and automated sentence rating). This classification yielded no misclassifications.

=== Norms ===
Standardization of the revised Boston Diagnostic Aphasia Examination is based on a normative sample of 242 patients with aphasic symptoms tested at the Boston VA Medical Center between 1976 and 1982.
