= Auditory =

Auditory means of or relating to the process of hearing:

- Auditory system, the neurological structures and pathways of sound perception
  - Auditory bulla, part of auditory system found in mammals other than primates
  - Auditory nerve, also known as the cochlear nerve is one of two parts of a cranial nerve
  - Auditory ossicles, three bones in the middle ear that transmit sounds
- Hearing (sense), the auditory sense, the sense by which sound is perceived
- Ear, the auditory end organ
- Cochlea, the auditory branch of the inner ear
- Sound, the physical signal perceived by the auditory system
- External auditory meatus, the ear canal
- Primary auditory cortex, the part of the higher-level of the brain that serves hearing
- Auditory agnosia
- Auditory exclusion, a form of temporary hearing loss under high stress
- Auditory feedback, an aid to control speech production and singing
- Auditory hallucination, perceiving sounds without auditory stimulus
- Auditory illusion, sound trick analogous to an optical illusion
- Auditory imagery, hearing in head in the absence of sound
- Auditory learning, learning by listening
- Auditory phonetics, the science of the sounds of language
- Auditory scene analysis, the process by which a scene containing many sounds is perceived
- Auditory science, concerning the perception of sound
