= Wernicke–Geschwind model =

Early theory of language processing

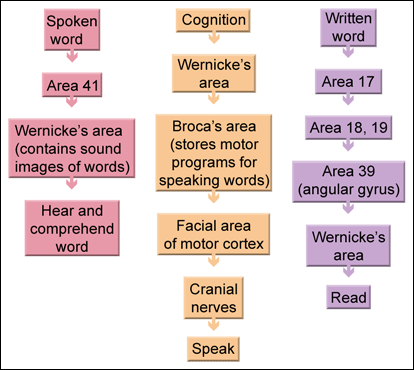
The classical Wernicke-Geschwind model of language

In the study of language processing, Carl Wernicke created an early neurological model of language, that later was revived by Norman Geschwind. The model is known as the Wernicke–Geschwind model.

1. For listening to and understanding spoken words, the sounds of the words are sent through the auditory pathways to area 41, which is the primary auditory cortex (Heschl's gyrus). From there, they continue to Wernicke's area, where the meaning of the words is extracted.
2. In order to speak, the meanings of words are sent from Wernicke's area via the arcuate fasciculus to Broca's area, where morphemes are assembled. The model proposes that Broca's area holds a representation for articulating words. Instructions for speech are sent from Broca's area to the facial area of the motor cortex, and from there instructions are sent to facial motor neurons in the brainstem, which relay movement orders to facial muscles.
3. In order to read, information concerning the written text is sent from visual areas 17, 18, and 19 to the angular gyrus (area 39) and from there to Wernicke's area, for silent reading or, together with Broca's area, for reading out loud.

This model is now obsolete. Nevertheless, it has been very useful in directing research and organizing research results, because it is based on the idea that language consists of two basic functions: comprehension, which is a sensory/perceptual function, and speaking, which is a motor function.
However, the neural organization of language is more complex than the Wernicke–Geschwind model of language suggests. The localization of speech in Broca's area is one of the weakest points of this model.
