= Western Aphasia Battery =

Medical test

Western Aphasia Battery (WAB) is an instrument for assessing the language function of adults with suspected aphasia as a result of a stroke, head injury, or dementia. The updated version is the Western Aphasia Battery-Revised (WAB-R). The battery helps discern the presence, degree, and type of aphasia. It can provide a baseline for monitoring changes during therapy. It is useful for determining what to treat. It can provide indications of the location of the lesion that caused the aphasia. The Western Aphasia Battery was introduced in 1980.

Another such test is the Boston Diagnostic Aphasia Examination.

WAB targets English-speakers between the ages of 18 and 89. It tests both linguistic and non linguistic skills. The linguistic skills assessed include, speech, fluency, auditory comprehension, reading and writing. Non-linguistic skills tested include drawing, calculation, block design, and apraxia.

== Aphasia quotient ==
The aphasia quotient (AQ) is the summary score that indicates overall severity of language impairment.

== WAB-R ==
The WAB–R is a battery of 8 subtests (32 short tasks). It maintains the structure, content, and clinical value of the earlier test. Additions:

- Two supplementary tasks (reading and writing irregular verbs and non-words) to aid the clinician in distinguishing surface, deep (phonological), and visual dyslexia.
- Revision of approximately 15 items
- Bedside WAB–R – provides a quick look at patient functioning
- Examiner's manual with technical/psychometric property information, test interpretation relevant to aphasic populations, historical evidence of reliability and validity, and information about the unique aspects of assessing the language ability of dementia patients
- Spiral-bound book replacing loose stimulus cards
- Revised administration directions – more user-friendly directions to the examinee for all subtests
- Expanded scoring guidelines
- Aphasia typing

== Scoring ==
Criterion cut scores:

- Aphasia Quotient
- Cortical Quotient
- Auditory Comprehension Quotient
- Oral Expression Quotient
- Reading Quotient
- Writing Quotient
- Bedside WAB–R scores

The battery was designed to provide a means of evaluating the major clinical aspects of language function: content, fluency, auditory comprehension, repetition and naming plus reading, writing and calculation. In addition to the nonverbal skills of drawing, block design and praxis are evaluated usually accompanied by Raven's Colored Progressive Matrices test.

The scoring provides two main totals, along with subscale scores. These are the Aphasia Quotient (AQ) score and Cortical Quotient (CQ) score.

AQ can be thought of as a measure of language ability. It reflects the severity of the spoken language deficit. It is a weighted composite of performance on 10 separate WAB subtests. Scores rate severity as follows: 0–25 is very severe, 26–50 is severe, 51–75 is moderate, and above 76 above is mild.

WAB has high validity and reliability. It offers high test-retest reliability, inter- and intra-judge reliability, face and content validity, and construct validity. High scores correlate with good functional communication skills.

CQ is a general measure of intellectual ability and includes all the subscales.
