= Auditory exclusion =

Temporary loss of hearing due to stress

Auditory exclusion is a form of temporary loss of hearing occurring under high stress. As such it is related to tunnel vision and "the slowing of time in the mind".

Auditory exclusion happens as a result of the physiological effects of the acute stress response, specifically an increased heart rate.

== Link to "Fight or Flight" response ==
In times of high stress, caused by both visual and auditory triggers, a person's “fight or flight” response can be triggered as they descend into a state of hyper-arousal. This is an evolutionary response involving the sympathetic nervous system that is triggered as a reaction to a perceived threat to the individual's life to help increase the chances of survival. The adrenal gland is alerted and as a result, adrenaline is released into the individual's bloodstream. This causes a number of physiological changes like increased heart rate, increased breathing and hyperfocus on the threat at hand. Additionally, cortisol is released from the adrenal glands which can provide the body with more energy in the short term. Contrastingly, over longer periods of time cortisol can obstruct thought processes, especially in high-emotion environments.

MRI scans have been used to investigate how the brain functions during decision making and which areas are responsible for processing different stimuli. From this we can identify areas of the brain linked to processing different senses. The primary auditory cortex (the area of the brain predominantly responsible for processing auditory information) is in the superior temporal gyrus in the temporal lobe, whereas the visual cortex (responsible for the process of visual information) is an area of the cerebral cortex in the occipital lobe.

During this “Fight or flight” /acute stress response, both areas of the conscious brain can struggle to process this information at the same time. Consequently, perceptual distortions can occur (e.g. slow motion/ tunnel vision, disruption of hearing) As a part of this, the processing of auditory information can be stopped completely, causing temporary hearing loss.

However, it is more common that the auditory cortex's functionality still remains but its efficiency is impaired. It has been reported that individuals can hear an unclear version of the noise around them, almost as if it is muffled. Others reported hearing a “hiss” or “ringing” noise, especially in combat situations.

== Auditory exclusion in combat ==
In addition, auditory exclusion can have a protective purpose. In situations like combat, where the noise created by gunfire or explosions is loud enough to cause significant damage, an individual's hearing can be suppressed or muted to the point where they are unaware of the severity of the noise until afterwards. Consequently, minimising any damage to the individual's hearing.

In 2019, author Scott W. Wagner wrote about a personal experience with auditory exclusion, detailing how he was involved in a SWAT raid that required him to “take down” a dangerous subject. Upon firing a taser gun, Wagner was unable to hear the “pop” that is usually heard when it is fired in addition to not hearing the subject's wife screaming less than 20 feet away from him.

During the fight or flight response, heart rate and breathing rate significantly increase as a result of the body requiring more energy to fuel a physical response to a stressful stimulus. An elevated heart rate can be used to partially explain the reason for auditory exclusion.

With 30+ years in the fire service, Dr. Richard B. Gasaway (contributor to the Situational Awareness Matters campaign) referenced a study in which a participant's base-level hearing was measured using an audiometer. This hearing test continued as the participants exercised on a treadmill to emulate the elevated heart rate that would occur during the stress response. It was revealed that hearing ability began to decline once the heart rate increased over 175 bpm. This is due to the increased blood flow in the eardrums that creates noise, causing the individual to lose hearing of the surrounding environment. This can manifest as a hissing or ringing in the individual's ears which consequently blocks out the noise around them. However, intentionally/voluntarily raising your heart rate to this level through exercise may not cause auditory exclusion. This is because the increase is not due to rapid hormonal changes that trigger the stress response, instead it is a gradual increase in heart rate as a result of exercise, i.e., it does not "shock" the body in the same way we do when encountering stressful situations.
