= Projection fiber =

Consist of efferent and afferent fibers uniting the cortex

Details

Identifiers
- Latin: fibrae projectionis
- NeuroNames: 1218
- TA98: A14.1.00.018
- TA2: 5617
- FMA: 76745

Projection fibers consist of efferent and afferent fibers uniting the cortex with the lower parts of the brain and with the spinal cord. In human neuroanatomy, bundles of axons (nerve fibers) called nerve tracts, within the brain, can be categorized by their function into association tracts, projection tracts, and commissural tracts.

In the neocortex, projection neurons are excitatory neurons that send axons to distant brain targets. Considering the six histologically distinct layers of the neocortex, associative projection neurons extend axons within one cortical hemisphere; commissural projection neurons extend axons across the midline to the contralateral hemisphere; and corticofugal projection neurons extend axons away from the cortex. That said, some neurons are multi-functional and can therefore be categorized into more than one such category.

== Efferent ==
The principal efferent fibers are:

1. the motor tract, occupying the genu and anterior two-thirds of the occipital part of the internal capsule, and consisting of
  1. the geniculate fibers, which decussate in the medulla, and end in the motor nuclei of the cranial nerves of the opposite side; and
  2. the cerebrospinal fibers, which are prolonged through the medullary pyramids into the spinal cord
2. the corticopontine fibers, ending in the pontine nuclei.

== Afferent ==
The chief afferent fibers are:

1. those of the lemniscus which are not interrupted in the thalamus;
2. those of the superior cerebellar peduncle which are not interrupted in the red nucleus and thalamus;
3. numerous fibers arising within the thalamus, and passing through its stalks to the different parts of the cortex;
4. optic and acoustic fibers, the former passing to the occipital, the latter to the temporal lobe.
