= Nerve tract =

Bundle of nerve fibers (axons) connecting nuclei of the central nervous system

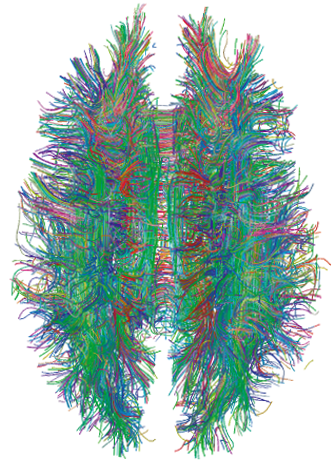
White matter tracts within a human brain, as visualized by MRI tractography

A nerve tract is a bundle of nerve fibers (axons) connecting nuclei of the central nervous system. In the peripheral nervous system, this is known as a nerve fascicle, and has associated connective tissue. There are three main types of nerve tracts in the central nervous system: association fibers, commissural fibers, and projection fibers. A nerve tract may also be referred to as a commissure, decussation, or neural pathway. A commissure connects the two cerebral hemispheres at the same levels, while a decussation connects at different levels (crosses obliquely).

== Types ==
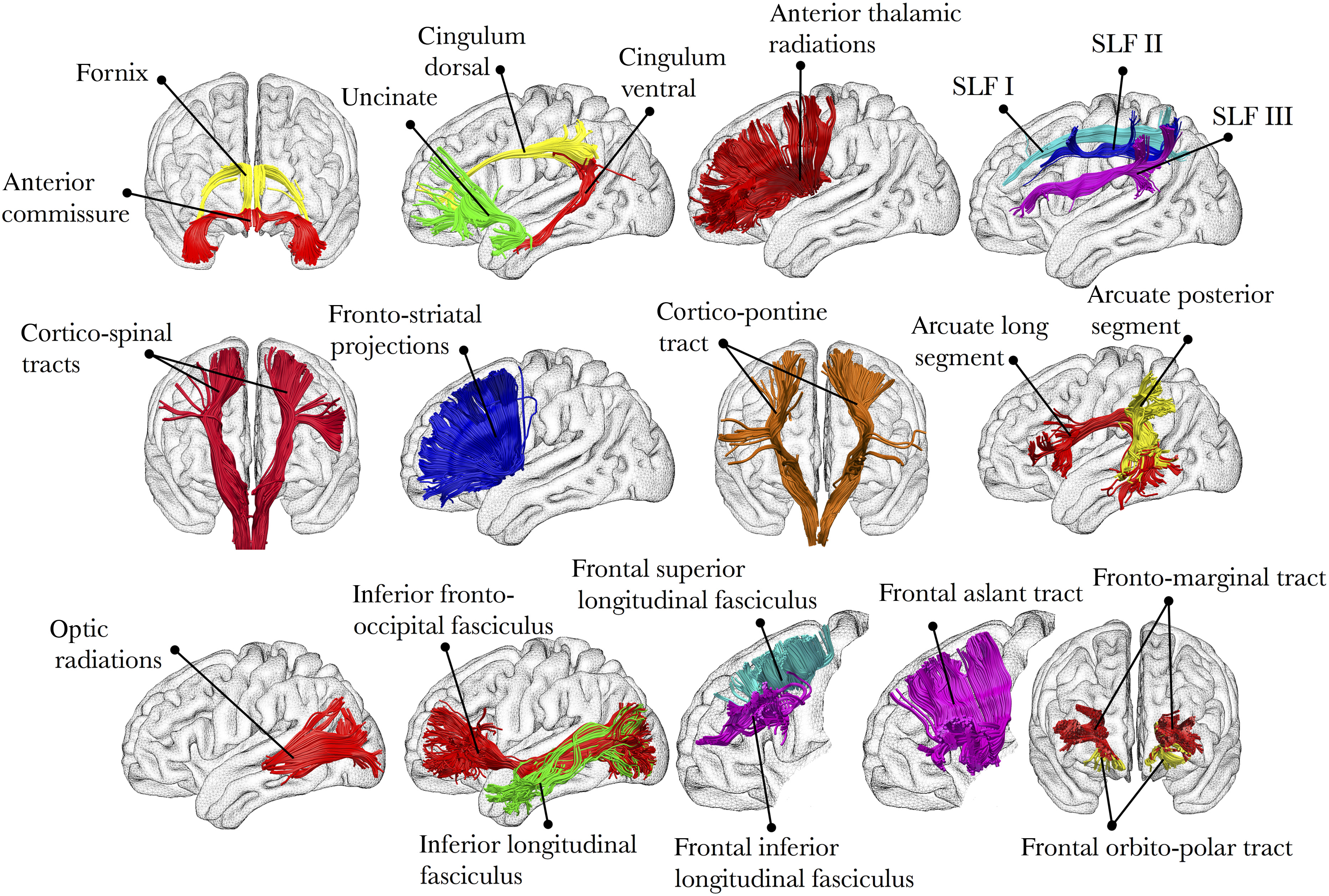

The nerve fibers in the central nervous system can be categorized into three groups on the basis of their course and connections. Different tracts may also be referred to as projections or radiations such as thalamocortical radiations.

=== Association fibers ===
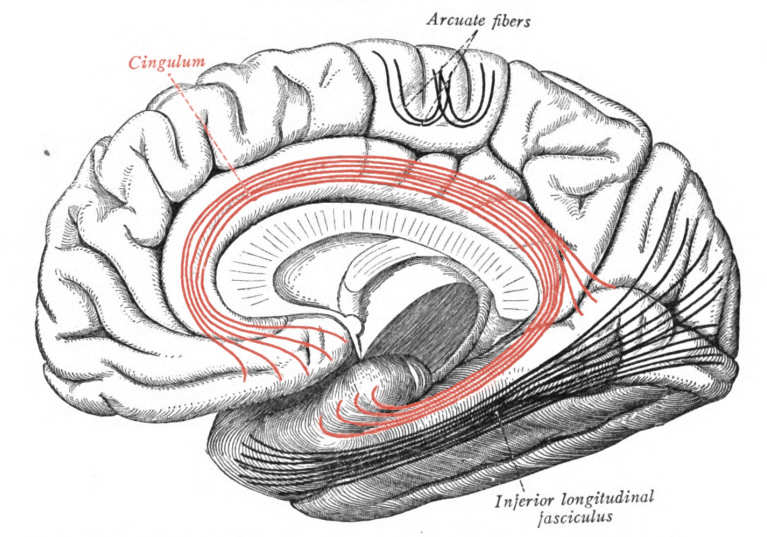
The cingulum shown in red in the cingulate gyrus.

The tracts that connect cortical areas within the same hemisphere are called association tracts. Long association fibers connect different lobes of a hemisphere to each other whereas short association fibers connect different gyri within a single lobe. Among their roles, association tracts link perceptual and memory centers of the brain.

The cingulum is a major association tract. The cingulum forms the white matter core of the cingulate gyrus and links from this to the entorhinal cortex. Another major association tract is the superior longitudinal fasciculus (SLF) that has three parts.

=== Commissural fibers ===
Commissural tracts connect corresponding cortical areas in the two hemispheres. They cross from one cerebral hemisphere to the other through bridges called commissures. The great majority of commissural tracts pass through the largest commissure the corpus callosum. A few tracts pass through the much smaller anterior and posterior commissures. Commissural tracts enable the left and right sides of the cerebrum to communicate with each other. Other commissures are the hippocampal commissure, and the habenular commissure.

=== Projection fibers ===
Projection tracts connect the cerebral cortex with the corpus striatum, diencephalon, brainstem and the spinal cord. The corticospinal tract for example, carries motor signals from the cerebrum to the spinal cord. Other projection tracts carry signals upward to the cerebral cortex. Superior to the brainstem, such tracts form a broad, dense sheet called the internal capsule between the thalamus and basal nuclei, then radiate in a diverging, fanlike array to specific areas of the cortex.

== See also ==
- Mammillotegmental tract
- Neuromodulation
- Neural circuit
- Nerve plexus
