= Ghislaine Dehaene-Lambertz =

French pediatrician and neuroscientist

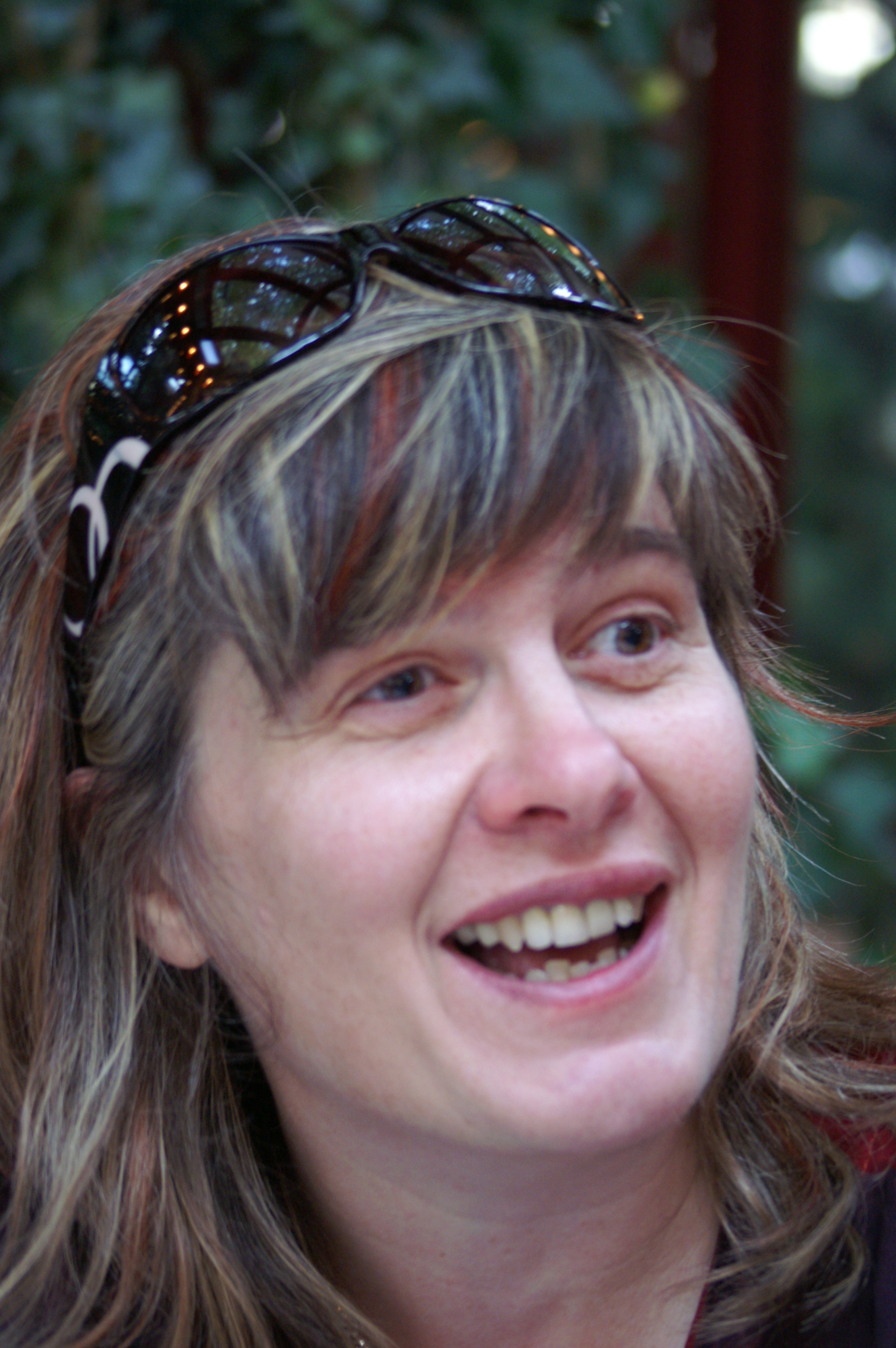
- Born: 23 November 1959 (age 66); Mayenne, France
- Education: University of Angers; François Rabelais University
- Awards: CNRS Silver Medal
- Scientific career
- Workplaces: CNRS
- Thesis: Early linguistic skills and their neural basis (1995)
- Doctoral advisor: Jacques Mehler

Ghislaine Dehaene-Lambertz (born 23 November 1959) is a French paediatrician. She is the Professor and Director of the Developmental Neuroimaging Lab at CNRS. Her research uses non-invasive brain imaging to understand children's cognitive function. She was elected to the National Academy of Sciences in 2022.

== Early life and education ==
Dehaene-Lambertz grew up in Mayenne. Her family were farmers. She studied medicine at the François Rabelais University. She moved to the University of Angers for her doctoral degree, where she researched cognitive science. She joined the French National Centre for Scientific Research (CNRS) in 1999.

== Research and career ==
Dehaene-Lambertz looks to understand how cognitive function emerge in the human brain. She achieves this by examining how infant brains understand and interact with the external world, and how this understanding is impacted by their environment and culture.

In the early 2000s Dehaene-Lambertz pioneered the use of functional magnetic resonance imaging, high-density event-related potentials and optical topography to better understand the infant brain. She has investigated language acquisition, and complex cognitive functions such as music, mathematics and facial perception. She was awarded a European Research Council Advanced Grant in 2016 to investigate neural mechanisms of learning in the brain.

Dehaene-Lambertz has written several popular science books, including Seeing the Mind: Spectacular Images from Neuroscience, and What They Reveal about Our Neuronal Selves.

== Awards and honours ==
- 2013 Prix Justine and Yves Sergent
- 2015 Elected to the Academia Europaea
- 2015 Grand Prix Scientifique de la Fondation de France
- 2016 Prix Scientifique de la Fondation NRJ
- 2018 CNRS Silver Medal
- 2022 Elected member of the National Academy of Sciences

== Selected publications ==
- L Cohen; S Dehaene; Naccache, Lionel; S Lehéricy; Dehaene-Lambertz, Ghislaine; M A Hénaff; F Michel (2000). "The visual word form area: spatial and temporal characterization of an initial stage of reading in normal subjects and posterior split-brain patients". Brain. 123 ( Pt 2): 291–307. doi:10.1093/brain/123.2.291. PMID 10648437. Wikidata Q33887806.
- J Mehler; P Jusczyk; G Lambertz; N Halsted; J Bertoncini; C Amiel-Tison (1988). "A precursor of language acquisition in young infants". Cognition. 29 (2): 143–78. doi:10.1016/0010-0277(88)90035-2. PMID 3168420. Wikidata Q28291944.
- Dehaene S; Naccache, Lionel; Le Clec'H G; Koechlin E; Mueller M; Dehaene-Lambertz G; van de Moortele PF; Le Bihan, Denis (1998). "Imaging unconscious semantic priming". Nature. 395 (6702): 597–600. doi:10.1038/26967. PMID 9783584. Wikidata Q34476388.

== Personal life ==
Dehaene-Lambertz is married to Stanislas Dehaene. Together they have three sons.
