= Neuronal recycling hypothesis =

Hypothesis in cognitive neuroscience

Visually different representations, but how do we read both as 'A'?

The neuronal recycling hypothesis was proposed by Stanislas Dehaene in the field of cognitive neuroscience in an attempt to explain the underlying neural processes which allow humans to acquire recently invented cognitive capacities. This hypothesis was formulated in response to the 'reading paradox', which states that these cognitive processes are cultural inventions too modern to be the products of evolution. The paradox lies within the fact that cross-cultural evidence suggests specific brain areas are associated with these functions. The concept of neuronal recycling resolves this paradox by suggesting that novel functions actually utilize and 'recycle' existing brain circuitry. Once these cognitive functions find a cortical area devoted to a similar purpose, they can invade the existing circuit. Through plasticity (an ongoing characteristic of the brain's cortical structure to change and reorganize through learning), the cortex can adapt in order to accommodate for these novel functions.

== History ==
Up until recently, social scientists did not believe brain biology was relevant to their field, and thus never attempted to research the biological mechanisms of such cultural acquisitions as reading and arithmetic. Many early social scientists held tabula rasa (blank slate) views, which was the notion that individuals are born with no mental content, and that organization and function of the brain comes solely from life experiences. The standard social science model views the brain simply as a large domain-general structure, whose functions have evolved gradually through cultural input. Today, many scientists continue to view the brain as a black box, where only its inputs and outputs can be measured, but their internal mechanisms will never be known.

One of the first discoveries relevant to this hypothesis came from a French neurologist, Joseph Jules Dejerine. He discovered that a stroke affecting a small area of the brain's left visual system left patients with selective impairments in reading. "Verbal blindness", a loss of the visual recognition of only letters and words, was the first diagnosis he made on a patient, and simultaneously the first conclusion regarding the cortical basis of reading in the brain. Dejerine's patient was still able to recognize numbers, which further implied the existence of separate areas of the brain being responsible for recognizing letters and words. Upon further study, the French neurologist found lesions affecting the posterior part of the left hemisphere, near the fusiform lobules in his patient. Currently, many patients have experienced these same symptoms of verbal blindness, but the term has been changed to pure alexia. It is now known to be the result of lesions to the occipitotemporal sulcus.

A relevant theory to this hypothesis is the concept of exaptations from evolutionary theory, which states that several evolved characteristics were initially selected for other functions, but later adapted to their current role. In essence, evolutionary pressures acted on existing mechanisms to accommodate new functions which may be more culturally relevant.

== Dehaene's neuronal recycling hypothesis ==
Neuronal recycling is the idea that novel cultural cognitive processes invade cortical areas initially devoted to different, but similar functions. This cortical architecture presents biases prior to learning, but through neuronal recycling, novel functions may be acquired, so long as they find a suitable cortical area in the brain to accommodate it. This area is referred to a cognitive function's 'neuronal niche', which is analogous to biology's concept of an ecological niche. The novel cultural function must locate a cortical area whose prior function is similar and plastic enough to accommodate it.

The concept of neuronal recycling is similar to exaptations in evolutionary theory, which states that several evolved functions are simply byproducts of an ancient biological mechanism. This process, however, is the reuse of biological mechanisms that occur as a result of brain plasticity, rather than evolutionary pressures on a population. Neuronal recycling produces changes in a matter of weeks to years which don't require a change in genome like evolutionary exaptations do.

The neuronal recycling hypothesis relies on the following assumptions:

- The organization of the human brain is subject to anatomical constraints from evolution and thus is not infinitely plastic. Neural maps are present in infancy which biases subsequent learning.
- Cultural tools like reading and writing are not present in the brain at birth, but rather must find a neuronal niche in the brain whose circuit is set up to perform a similar function and is sufficiently plastic to reorient itself enough to accommodate this novel use.
- The original organization of the cerebral cortex is never fully erased once these cultural tools invade the cortical areas. Instead, these initial neural constraints exert a powerful influence on what can be learned.

Based on these assumptions, this hypothesis predicts the following:

- Each cultural tool should be associated with specific cortical areas, consistent across individuals and cultures.
- Cultural variability regarding the acquired cognitive processes should be limited due to neural constraints.
- The speed and ease of cultural acquisitions should be predictable based on the amount and complexity of the recycling required.

== Reading ==
Reading has only been a part of human culture for approximately 5400 years, and therefore many conclude that it is too modern to be the result of evolution. The neuronal recycling hypothesis proposes that visual word recognition is a result of recycling cortical structures whose initial functions were for object recognition. The visual word form area is situated next to a number of cortical areas activated by object images, suggesting it was previously biased to play a role in object recognition. Also, recycled structures acquire new functions such as the ability to recognize letters regardless of their size, shape, or case.

As was stated in the neuronal recycling hypothesis, brain circuits bias what we are able to learn. One bias identified involves the preference of central versus peripheral images at different points along the cerebral cortex. It was observed that in all individuals, the visual word form area fell on the region of the cortex with a massive preference for fine-grained, central images. This area is most suitable to accommodate reading ability, due to the high degree of visual precision necessary to perform this function effectively. Another cortical bias relevant to reading comes from the lateralization of cerebral hemispheres. Reading consistently activates the left hemisphere, which is associated with language abilities and discriminating between small shapes, showing a clear bias towards reading functions. There is a preadaptation of the inferior temporal cortex that we use when learning to read. It is the area activated during invariant object recognition, and its sufficient plasticity allows it to accommodate the new shapes and symbols necessary for reading.

Synaptic plasticity is much greater in children, explaining why they acquire language more easily than adults. Exposing children to reading results in a massive reorientation of human cognition in the inferior temporal cortex. As children increase their reading expertise, the occipitotemporal sulcus should strengthen, eventually becoming specialized to writing as well.

=== Visual word form area ===
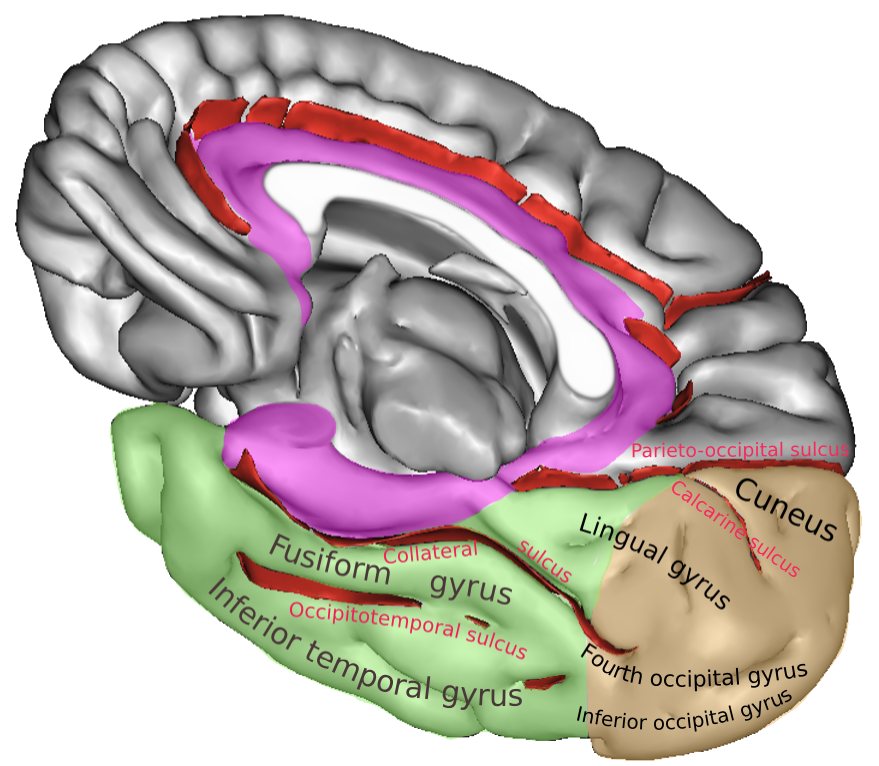
Occipotemporal sulcus

The visual word form area (VWFA) is located in the left lateral occipitotemporal sulcus. This area overlaps with the part of the ventral visual cortex that detects the presence of line junctions, and thus is thought to have provided the VWFA with its neuronal niche. Biederman (1987) found that line vertices are more essential to object recognition than line segments. Cross-culturally, letters/symbols used in written language are all made up of a small number of lines which meet at vertices. This suggests that cerebral constraints have influenced the development of writing systems and that there are limits on what kind of cultural inventions we can accommodate. Furthermore, computer simulations have shown that letter perception in deep neural networks is facilitated by recycling low-level visual features learned from natural images, thereby supporting the hypothesis that the structure of letter shapes has been culturally selected to match the structure of human natural environments.

There has been a large amount of evidence supporting the existence of the visual word form area. This area is only activated for reading visual words, as opposed to speaking or hearing them. Lesions at this location result in pure alexia, a deficit in word recognition, while other language abilities remain intact. The visual word form area is activated by reading real words and pseudowords more so than random consonant strings, suggesting that it has adapted to incorporate orthographic regularities in language. It also consistently represents visual words regardless of irrelevant variations, which side of the visual field they're presented on, or whether they're uppercase or lowercase.

== Arithmetic ==
The invention of Arabic numerals is even more recent than reading and writing, and thus is subject to the same recycling process. Imaging studies show evidence that mental arithmetic is associated with the left and right parietal lobe. Activation of this area is directly proportional with the degree of difficulty in the given calculation. During imaging, a small region inside the intraparietal sulcus is only activated during calculation tasks when visuospatial, language, and calculation tasks are also given. This same area is activated when subjects must detect numerals only in a stream of varying stimuli, indicating that the process of calculations is not necessary to activate it, but only the recognition of numerals. Lesions to the intraparietal sulcus result in severe impairments in calculation without impairments in related processes such as reasoning skills.

== Criticisms ==
The major criticism directed towards the neuronal recycling hypothesis concerns the existence of the visual word form area. Scientists have found that the left occipitotemporal sulcus was activated when reading words through a series of imaging studies, and that lesions to this area impaired word reading.

Critical scientists claim that patients with pure alexia commonly have extensive left occipital lesions which include damaged areas surrounding the visual word form area. It is therefore impossible to conclude the resulting impairments are symptoms caused from the lesion of that particular area. A proposed alternative explanation for this phenomenon is disconnection syndrome, whereby the occipitotemporal lesion disconnects the visual processing area from language processing. However, the fact that these patients show impairments in other forms of object recognition refutes this theory.

Using imaging studies, scientists found that the visual word form area played a clear role in reading. However, they also found the same area to be active during several other forms of object recognition and naming tasks. Additionally, activation of this area was also observed when subjects were asked to think about the meaning of spoken words, hear definitions of objects and make meaningful decisions about them, or when they imagine an object. Furthermore, the same area is activated when blind subjects read via tactile stimulation, implying that the visual word form area processes more than just visual stimuli.

In response to these criticisms, Cohen & Deheane proposed there is a functional specialization in the visual word form area for reading, which is reproducible across subjects and cultures. They do not believe there is specific selectivity for word recognition because it is activated by other stimuli, such as the aforementioned object recognition and naming tasks. This can, however, be explained by the fact that this cortical area was recycled in order to accommodate reading functions, and thus it is not unlikely to be activated in other, similar tasks.

Cohen and Dehaene suggest two possible directions to study the visual word form area and reach a conclusion:

Spatial localization
By using high spatial resolution imaging, focus on examining the degree of reproducible localization in the VWFA. This will determine whether small areas within this location are specialized for word recognition, as studies show the entire area is not.
Functional specialization
Coarser imaging methods can be used to study this. It consists of examining the functional specialization of reading processes in the visual word form area to see if any processes associated with reading are specific to that area.

== Related theories ==
	Introduction	Comparison to Neuronal Recycling Hypothesis
Shared circuits model Susan Hurley	This model suggests that perception and action share one common circuit, as opposed to the frequently held view that cognitive functions process vertically. This model views the mind as being organized in a "...horizontally modular architecture", and explains that the perception and action dynamically interact in one shared space.	Like the neuronal recycling hypothesis, this model goes against the standard social science view that the mind is made of large-scale processors dedicated to broad domains of function. It also views the mind as modular, and that perception and action share a pre-existing information space. Higher functions are built on this space, essentially reusing and adding onto the pre-existing architecture.
Massive redeployment hypothesis Michael Anderson	This hypothesis proposes that evolution favours the brain's reusing of existing circuitry for new tasks, as opposed to developing brand new circuits. He predicts more recent cognitive functions will activate more widely scattered areas of the brain.	The difference between this hypothesis and the neuronal recycling hypothesis can be identified through their names. Massive redeployment focuses on the reusing of existing components, and proposes that low level circuitry combine to produce more complex cognitive functions. In contrast, neuronal recycling suggests that novel functions reuse circuitry by actually invading existing cortical areas, and utilizing brain plasticity as a mechanism to facilitate these cortical changes.

== Future research ==
New studies have adapted this hypothesis to explain cross modal plasticity which seems to occur in blind people. This is the fact that other senses in blind people seem to be heightened as a result of the loss of vision. Since blind patients are not exposed to the novel function of visual reading, the cortical area normally devoted to this function will be used for a different function. For example, scientists have found that the neural networks devoted to detecting moving sounds in blind people seem to be recruited by the area of the visual cortex responsible for visual movement in the sighted. This supports the theory that novel functions must find a neuronal niche, with existing cortical areas capable of supporting the function. This idea might also be applied to explain cross modality in deaf patients, and other cross modal phenomena such as synethesia and the McGurk effect.

This hypothesis provides an understanding of the neural processes necessary for acquiring novel functions. With this framework in place, future research can expand on these ideas to study the effects of education on these particular brain areas, or the how limited exposure to reading and arithmetic at an early age affects them. Knowledge of how brain plasticity works in regards to such fundamental skills as reading, writing, and arithmetic, has clear applications in education techniques.
