= David M. Rosenthal (philosopher) =

American philosopher

David Rosenthal
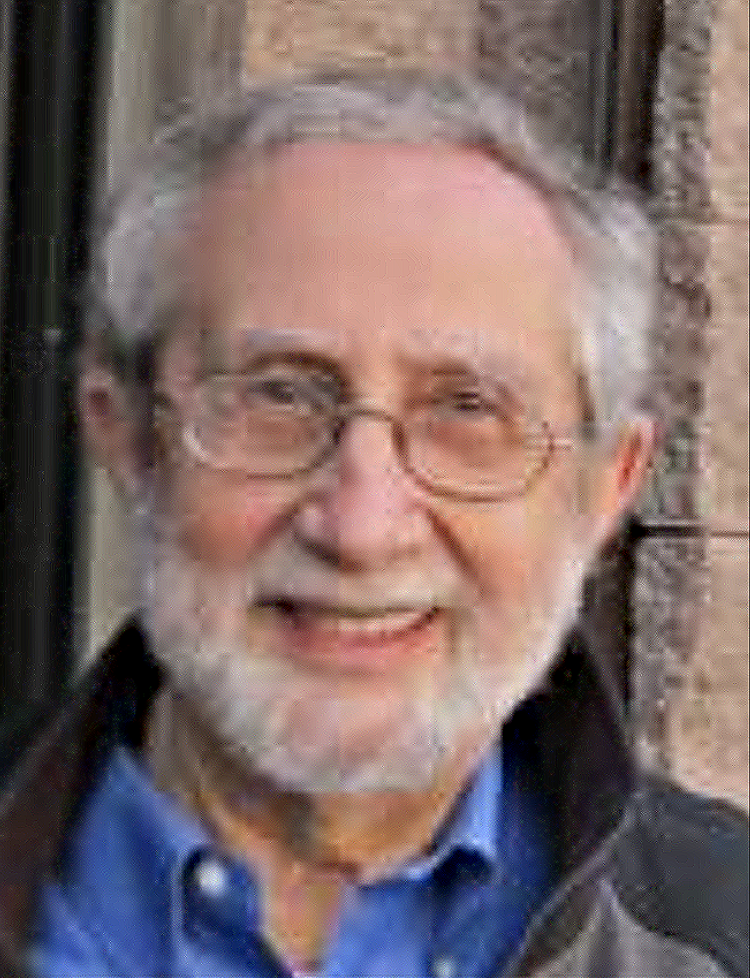
- Born: 1948 (age 77–78)

Philosophical work
- Era: Contemporary philosophy
- Region: Western philosophy
- Notable ideas: Higher-order-thought (HOT) theory of consciousness Quality-space theory of mental qualities
- Website: www.davidrosenthal.org

David Rosenthal (born 1948) is an American philosopher who has made significant contributions to the philosophy of mind, particularly in the area of consciousness and related topics. He is professor of philosophy at the Graduate Center of the City University of New York (CUNY). He was educated at the University of Chicago and then Princeton University. Rosenthal also has research interests in cognitive science, and is Coordinator of the CUNY Graduate Center's Interdisciplinary Concentration in Cognitive Science. And he has done work in philosophy of language, metaphysics, ancient philosophy, and 17th-century rationalism.

Rosenthal is a founding member and past president (2008) of the Association for the Scientific Study of Consciousness.

== Higher-order thoughts ==
Rosenthal is best known for his higher-order-thought (HOT) theory of consciousness. A mental state is never conscious if one is in no way aware of that state. So Rosenthal argues that we can best explain what it is for a mental state to be conscious by appeal to one's being aware of that state in a suitable way. Consciousness is a matter of how one's mental life subjectively appears to one; one's awareness of one's mental states constitutes that mental appearance (Rosenthal 2022).

Rosenthal's account of consciousness must then specify the way one is aware of a mental state when that state is conscious. He argues that this awareness consists in a thought that one is in that state. These higher-order thoughts (HOTs) constitute the mental appearance of consciousness, and so suffice for there to be something it is like for to be in various conscious states. HOTs are distinct from the states they make one aware of. Also, HOTs are rarely themselves conscious, and they never result from any conscious inference. So HOTs make it appear subjectively that our awareness of our conscious states is direct and transparent.

Because consciousness is a psychological phenomenon, any explanation of what it is for a mental state to be conscious must primarily be cast in psychological terms. And on pain of an uninformative circularity, an explanation cannot appeal to psychological phenomena that are themselves conscious. HOTs satisfies these constraints, since HOTs are psychological occurrences that are rarely conscious. Because HOTs are seldom conscious, we know about them not from first-person access, but because they are theoretical posits whose occurrence is established by their significant explanatory role.

The standard way to tell whether a mental state is conscious, both in everyday contexts and in experimental work, is that an individual can report being in the state without relying on any conscious inference. So Rosenthal argues that, for creatures with the relevant linguistic ability, a state's being conscious involves the ability to report that state. Also, a report always expresses a thought with the same content as the report, and in this case the thought is a HOT. So Rosenthal also argues that the role of reporting provides compelling reason to see our subjective awareness of our conscious states as consisting in HOTs (Rosenthal 2005, ch. 2).

Rosenthal has also argued that positing HOTs enables us to explain various things we could not explain in any other way. One striking example is why thoughts are always conscious when they are verbally expressed (Rosenthal 2005, ch. 10); another example is why the so-called essential indexical appears to be irreducible, along with other features of the awareness and identification of the self (Rosenthal 2012). Rosenthal has also argued that the HOT theory fits well with recent findings in psychology and neuroscience (e.g., Lau and Rosenthal 2011).

== Quality-space theory ==
It is often claimed in the literature in philosophy that qualitative mental properties are intrinsically conscious, and cannot occur without being conscious. Rosenthal rejects that claim, and has developed a positive account of qualitative consciousness that is thoroughly realist about conscious mental qualities, but explains what mental qualities are independently of consciousness. That fits well with HOT theory, on which a state's being conscious is never an intrinsic property of that state. But Rosenthal argues for his account of mental qualities independently of HOT theory (Rosenthal, 2005. chs. 5–7; 2015).

On Rosenthal's quality-space theory, mental qualities are fixed not by consciousness, but by their role in the perceptual discrimination of stimulus properties. The theory first constructs a space of stimulus properties that are discriminable by a particular sensory modality, relying on noticeable differences (JNDs) between close pairs of stimulus properties. The theory then posits that mental qualities are the mental properties that enable those JND discriminations. Since perceptual discrimination occurs both consciously and unconsciously, the account is independent of consciousness. And since qualitative mental states are not intrinsically conscious, Rosenthal explains why some qualitative states are conscious by appeal to one's being aware of them with HOTs.

On quality-space theory, both conscious and unconscious perceptual states exhibit mental qualities; the mental qualities occur consciously in one case and unconsciously in the other. Mental qualities are what conscious and unconscious perceiving have in common, in virtue of which they are both genuinely perceptual. If one held that mental qualities occur only consciously, one would have either to reject unconscious perceiving altogether or to invoke an ad hoc account of what mental properties if any conscious and unconscious perceiving have in common in virtue of which both count as perceiving.

Those who hold that mental qualities are intrinsically conscious typically appeal to intuitions to that effect. Rosenthal argues that we should not credit such intuitions, since they rely on subjective awareness, which in turn has no access to any mental phenomena that are not conscious. Also, taking such intuitions at face value has an anti-theoretical effect, disallowing anything not sanctioned by first-person access. And these methodological considerations aside, such intuitions are offset by other robust intuitions, well-entrenched in common sense, which underwrite conceiving of mental qualities in terms of their characteristic perceptual roles.

A special benefit of quality-space theory is that it enables an independent, non-question-begging way to individuate the sensory modalities (Rosenthal 2015). Modalities are distinct just in case no mental quality of one modality is just noticeably different from some mental quality in the other.

On the combined HOT and quality-space theory, HOTs represent qualitative states in the way quality-space theory describes them. So on that combined theory we are subjectively aware of mental qualities in respect of their location in a quality space relative to other mental qualities in that space. Rosenthal notes that this is a signal advantage of the combined theory, since we typically describe what it is like to be in conscious qualitative states in just such comparative terms. We naturally and spontaneously describe what it is like for us to be in a qualitative state by comparing it with others that result from stimuli that are currently present or that result from stimuli of a familiar type.

Some theorists have claimed we can say nothing informative about the types of conscious qualitative states. But that would be so only if one insisted on a noncomparative, atomistic description, an insistence that has no independent basis. The comparative account of conscious mental qualities is in this way an advantage of the combined quality-space and HOT theory.

== Relations to other theories ==
Rosenthal's HOT theory of consciousness resembles the traditional inner-sense theory, on which we are aware of conscious states by some inner sense. But the traditional inner-sense theory faces the difficulty of explaining what that dedicated inner sense could be, and HOT theory avoids that problem. A particular version of inner-sense theory, known as higher-order-perception (HOP) theory, posits a perceptual higher-order awareness. But that version has typically been advanced in combination with the intentionalist view that perceiving is exclusively conceptual. So it is unclear how to differentiate that version from HOT theory (Rosenthal 2004).

Rosenthal's theory also resembles Franz Brentano’s theory of consciousness, though Brentano held that our awareness of our mental states is intrinsic to those states, and also denied that mental states ever occur without being conscious. In addition, because the HOTs Rosenthal posits, unlike Brentano's intrinsic inner awareness, are distinct from the mental states they make one aware of, HOT theory can accommodate neuropsychological evidence that this higher-order awareness diverges, both spatially and temporally (e.g., Libet), from the states they make one aware of (Rosenthal 2004; 2005, p. 361).

Global-workspace (GW) theories (Stanislas Dehaene & Lionel Naccache, and Bernard Baars) posit that mental states are conscious in virtue of their content's having wide availability to various downstream processes. Both GW theories and HOT theory explain what it is for a state to be conscious by appeal to psychological phenomena that are not themselves conscious, thereby avoiding circularity. And both point to prefrontal cortex for their neurological implementation, since global availability and a higher-order awareness are likely both implemented there. But Rosenthal argues that GW theories face the difficulty that many mental states, such as relatively peripheral perceptions and stray thoughts, can be conscious even though their content is minimally available if at all. In addition, there are likely unconscious mental states whose content has relatively global effects, such as repressed and other unconscious thoughts and desires.

The first-order approaches of Thomas Nagel, Ned Block, Fred Dretske, and others deny that a state's being conscious consists in one's being aware of that state, and hold instead that the property of being conscious is intrinsic to the relevant states. Rosenthal argues that this makes it difficult if possible at all to explain how conscious states differ psychologically from unconscious mental states.

First-order theorists also often claim that HOT theory is defective in taking the higher-order awareness to be distinct from the first-order mental state one is aware of, since it is then open that subjective awareness might sometimes misrepresent that first-order state. Rosenthal has countered that such misrepresentation by consciousness does actually occur, e.g., in change blindness. Still, if one held that it doesn't, one could readily retain HOT theory and just add that stipulation. The real complaint is simply that HOT theory doesn't construe subjective awareness as intrinsic to conscious states.

Quality spaces have been invoked by other theorists in connection with mental qualities. But those other appeals do not rely on the discriminability of stimulus properties. Instead, they typically construct the quality space by appealing directly to subjective assessments of similarity and difference among the mental qualities themselves, often using conscious multidimensional scaling. This may sometimes reflect a conviction that mental qualities are intrinsically conscious, so that unconscious cases need not be considered.

But that issue aside, Rosenthal argues that constructing quality spaces in that way has serious disadvantages. Because subjective assessments of mental qualities tend not to be replicable and are relatively generic, they cannot support a stable or fine-grained taxonomy of mental qualities. And we cannot without circularity explain what mental qualities are by appeal to structural relations among mental qualities. The initial reliance on stimulus properties is crucial. And with it the door to unconscious mental qualities opens.

Some theoretical discussions of consciousness rely primarily or even exclusively on a neural correlate of consciousness, with no account in psychological terms of what consciousness is. Rosenthal argues that this is a mistake. A neural implementation can fine-tune and even modify how we understand consciousness in psychological terms, but we must have some independent psychological account to know whether a proposed neural correlate implements the right psychological phenomenon. Also, just as molecular composition explains the macroscopic properties of physical objects, so a test for any proposed neural implementation is whether it explains the psychological properties of consciousness. We must have an independent account of what those psychological properties are.

The focus on a neural correlate also encourages treating consciousness as a kind of neural on-off switch, which neurally transforms a state that is not conscious into a state that is. Rosenthal argues that it is doubtful that such a model is compatible with any explanation in psychological terms of the variety of ways in which there is something it is like to be in a conscious state. Any such explanation will likely have to rely on some type of higher-order awareness.

Alternative higher-order theories often combine higher-order machinery with features of a first-order picture of conscious states, perhaps out of sympathy with the first-order intuition that conscious is an intrinsic property. Rosenthal argues that taking that intuition at face value precludes any informative explanation of what it is for a state to be conscious.

== Current research ==
Rosenthal has recently addressed the issue of the utility of consciousness, asking how much of the utility a conscious state has is due to the property of being conscious, as against the state's other mental properties. Rosenthal argues that most of a conscious state's utility, perhaps almost all, is due to those other mental properties, since those properties underwrite utilities that are specific to the various types of mental state. This consideration is wholly independent of HOT theory. If the utility of a mental state's being conscious is minimal, we can not appeal to utility to explain why some mental states are conscious. So Rosenthal has proposed alternative explanations of that.

Rosenthal has also recently argued that the confidence an individual has in a mental state's content is independent of that state's being conscious. Confidence is often present even with unconscious mental states, though the confidence may itself then be unconscious. And conscious states also often occur without any confidence in their content. So confidence and related considerations cannot provide a reliable measure of consciousness. And a measure that relied on confidence that is itself conscious would be circular.

Rosenthal has also written extensively about the connections among consciousness, thought, and speech, and has edited and co-edited several anthologies.

== Bibliography ==
- Consciousness, co-edited with Josh Weisberg (2022)
- Consciousness and Mind (2005)
- Materialism and the Mind-Body Problem, editor (1971); second edition (2000)
- The Nature of Mind, editor (1991)
- Applied Ethics and Ethical Theory, co-editor (1988)

Rosenthal is also the author of numerous articles, many of which are available on his webpage.

== See also ==
- American philosophy
- Consciousness
- Philosophy of Mind
- List of American philosophers
