= Disconnection syndrome =

Collection of neurological symptoms

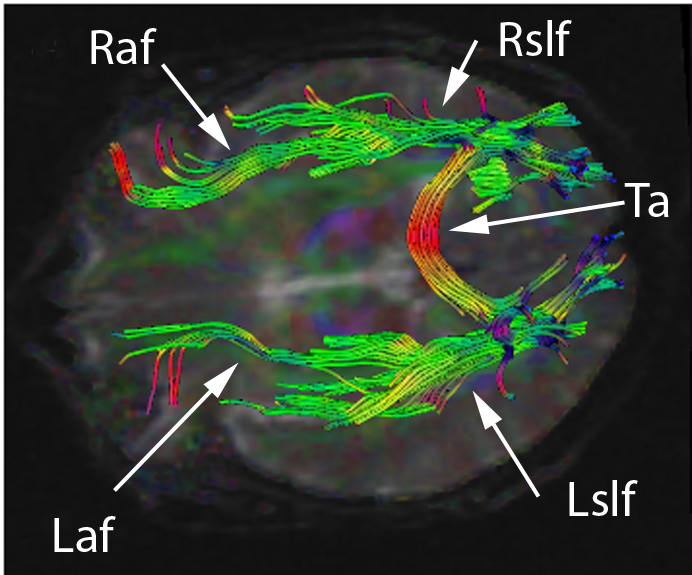
Diffusion tensor imaging of the brain showing the right and left arcuate fasciculus (Raf & Laf), the right and left superior longitudinal fasciculus (Rslf & Lslf), and tapetum of corpus callosum (Ta).

Disconnection syndrome is a general term for a collection of neurological symptoms caused – via lesions to associational or commissural nerve fibres – by damage to the white matter axons of communication pathways in the cerebrum (not to be confused with the cerebellum), independent of any lesions to the cortex. The behavioral effects of such disconnections are relatively predictable in adults. Disconnection syndromes usually reflect circumstances where regions A and B still have their functional specializations except in domains that depend on the interconnections between the two regions.

Callosal syndrome, or split-brain, is an example of a disconnection syndrome from damage to the corpus callosum between the two hemispheres of the brain. Disconnection syndrome can also lead to aphasia, left-sided apraxia, and tactile aphasia, among other symptoms. Other types of disconnection syndrome include conduction aphasia (lesion of the association tract connecting Broca’s area and Wernicke’s), agnosia, apraxia, pure alexia, etc.

== Anatomy of cerebral connections ==
Theodore Meynert, a neuroanatomist of the late 1800s, developed a detailed anatomy of white matter pathways. He classified the white matter fibers that connect the neocortex into three important categories – projection fibers, commissural fibers and association fibers. Projection fibers are the ascending and descending pathways to and from the neocortex. Commissural fibers are responsible for connecting the two hemispheres while the association fibers connect cortical regions within a hemisphere. These fibers make up the interhemispheric connections in the cortex.

Callosal disconnection syndrome is characterized by left ideomotor apraxia and left-hand agraphia and/or tactile anomia, and is relatively rare.

== Hemispheric disconnection ==
Many studies have shown that disconnection syndromes such as aphasia, agnosia, apraxia, pure alexia and many others are not caused by direct damage to functional neocortical regions. They can also be present on only one side of the body which is why these are categorized as hemispheric disconnections. The cause for hemispheric disconnection is if the interhemispheric fibers, as mentioned earlier, are cut or reduced.

An example is commissural disconnect in adults which usually results from surgical intervention, tumor, or interruption of the blood supply to the corpus callosum or the immediately adjacent structures. Callosal disconnection syndrome is characterized by left ideomotor apraxia and left-hand agraphia and/or tactile anomia, and is relatively rare.

Other examples include commissurotomy, the surgical cutting of cerebral commissures to treat epilepsy and callosal agenesis which is when individuals are born without a corpus callosum. Those with callosal agenesis can still perform interhemispheric comparisons of visual and tactile information but with deficits in processing complex information when performing the respective tasks.

== Sensorimotor disconnection ==
Hemispheric disconnection has impacted behaviors relating to the sensory and motor systems. The different systems affected are listed below:

- Olfaction – The olfactory system is not crossed across hemispheres like the other senses, which means that left input goes to the left hemisphere and right input goes to the right hemisphere. Fibers in the anterior commissure control the olfactory regions in each hemisphere. A patient who lacks an anterior commissure cannot name odors entering the right nostril or use the right hand to pick up the object corresponding to the odor because the left hemisphere, responsible for language and controlling the right hand, is disconnected from the sensory information.
- Vision – Information from one visual field travels to the contralateral hemisphere. Therefore, with a commissurotomy patient, visual information presented in the left visual field travelling to the right hemisphere would be disconnected from verbal output since the left hemisphere is responsible for speech.
- Somatosensory – If the two hemispheres are disconnected, the somatosensory functions of the left and right parts of the body become independent. For example, when something is placed on the left hand of a blindfolded patient with the two hemispheres disconnected, the left hand can pick the correct object within a set of objects but the right hand cannot.
- Audition – Though most of the input from one ear would go through the same ear, the opposite ear also receives some input. Therefore, the disconnection effects seems to be reduced in audition compared to the other systems. However, studies have shown that when the hemispheres are disconnected, the individual does not hear anything from the left and only hears from the right.
- Movement – Apraxia and agraphia may occur where responding to any verbal instructions by movement or writing in the left hand is inhibited because the left hand cannot receive these instructions from the right hemisphere.

== History ==
The concept of disconnection syndrome emerged in the late nineteenth century when scientists became aware that certain neurological disorders result from communication problems among brain areas. In 1874, Carl Wernicke introduced this concept in his dissertation when he suggested that conduction aphasia could result from the disconnection of the sensory speech zone from the motor speech area by a single lesion in the left hemisphere to the arcuate fasciculus. As the father of the disconnection theory, Wernicke believed that instead of being localized in specific regions of the brain, higher functions resulted from associative connections between the motor and sensory memory areas.

Lissauer, a pupil of Wernicke, described a case of visual agnosia as a disconnection between the visual and language areas.

Dejerine in 1892 described specific symptoms resulting from a lesion to the corpus callosum that caused alexia without agraphia. The patient had a lesion in the left occipital lobe, blocking sight in the right visual field (hemianopia), and in the splenium of the corpus callosum. Dejerine interpreted this case as a disconnection of the speech area in the left hemisphere from the right visual cortex.

In 1965, Norman Geschwind, an American neurologist, wrote ‘Disconnexion syndromes in animals and man’ where he described a disconnectionist framework that revolutionized neurosciences and clinical neurology. Studies of the monkey brain led to his theory that disconnection syndromes were higher function deficits. Building on Wernicke and previously mentioned psychologists’ idea that disconnection syndromes involved white matter lesion to association tracts connecting two regions of the brain, Geschwind was more detailed in explaining some disconnection syndromes as lesions of the association cortex itself, specifically in the parietal lobe. He described the callosal syndrome, an example of a disconnection syndrome, which is a lesion in the corpus callosum that leads to tactile anomia in just the patient’s left hand.

Though Geschwind made significant advances in describing disconnection syndromes, he was not completely accurate. He didn’t think the association cortex had any specialized role of its own besides acting as a relay station between the primary sensory and motor areas. However, in the 1960s and 1970s, Mesulam and Damasio incorporated specific functional roles for the association cortex. With Mesulam and Damasio’s contributions, Geschwind’s model has evolved over the past 50 years to include connections between brain regions as well as specializations of association cortices.

More recently, neurologists have been using imaging techniques such as diffusion tensor imaging (DTI) and functional magnetic resonance imaging (fMRI) to visualize association pathways in the human brain to advance the future of this disconnection theme.

== See also ==
- Functional disconnection
