= Margaret Defeyter =

British psychologist

Margaret Anne Defeyter
- Education: University of Essex
- Scientific career
- Workplaces: Northumbria University
- Thesis: Acquiring an understanding of design : evidence from functional fixedness problems and verbal fluency tasks (2003)

Margaret "Greta" Anne Defeyter is a British psychologist who is Professor of Developmental Psychology at the Northumbria University. Her research looks to understand food insecurity, school breakfast club programmes, and the impact of holiday hunger programmes on the cognitive performance and wellbeing of children. She was Children's Food Hero by Sustain in 2006, and appointed an Officer of the Order of the British Empire in 2024. In 2026 she was included in the UK's Who's Who.

== Early life and education ==
Defeyter returned to the United Kingdom in 1993 after living in the United States. She studied psychology at the University of Essex. She has said that whilst she was supported by a Local Education Authority grant, she still struggled to make ends meet. She was awarded an Economic and Social Research Council grant to support her doctoral research, where she studied verbal fluency tasks. Her early research looked to understand how children understand the functions of objective. She was appointed a lecturer at Northumbria University, where she supervised a doctoral researcher who was interested in how breakfast cereal impacted children's cognition. This prompted Defeyter to study the impact of school breakfast club attendance on young people's education outcomes.

== Research and career ==
Defeyter founded the 'Healthy Living' Lab at Northumbria University. Her research considers food insecurity and how it influences the cognitive performance, behaviour, and wellbeing of young people. Defeyter has demonstrated that food insecurity is associated with poor health outcomes, and that the that proportion of children who experience food insecurity over the holidays is increasing. She showed that children on free school dinners lag behind their more affluent peers. Defeyter worked with Kellogg's and Magic Breakfast to show the influence of breakfast clubs on school attendance and punctuality.

Defeyter served as an advisor on the Department for Education Holiday Activities and Food Programme which provides food and childcare to low income families in the United Kingdom. She is an advisor on the Gateshead Poverty Truth Commission, which develops strategies to tackle poverty and inequality in Gateshead.

Defeyter worked with the Centre For Young Lives to create an evidence-based strategy to increase children's physical activity, mental health and wellbeing. This included enrolment on free school dinners, improve the nutritional content of school meals and increase access to physical activity throughout the school day.

== Awards and honours ==
- 2006 Sustain Children's Food Hero
- 2020 The Big Issue Top Change Maker
- 2015 Fellow of the British Psychological Society
- 2024 Appointed Officer of the Order of the British Empire

== Selected publications ==
- Andy J Daly-Smith; Stephen Zwolinsky; Jim McKenna; Phillip D Tomporowski; Margaret Anne Defeyter; Andrew Manley (27 March 2018). "Systematic review of acute physically active learning and classroom movement breaks on children's physical activity, cognition, academic performance and classroom behaviour: understanding critical design features". BMJ Open Sport & Exercise Medicine. 4 (1) e000341. doi:10.1136/BMJSEM-2018-000341. ISSN 2055-7647. PMC 5884342. PMID 29629186.
- T P German; M A Defeyter (1 December 2000). "Immunity to functional fixedness in young children". Psychonomic Bulletin and Review. 7 (4): 707–712. doi:10.3758/BF03213010. ISSN 1069-9384. PMID 11206213.
- Margaret Anne Defeyter; Tim P German (1 September 2003). "Acquiring an understanding of design: evidence from children's insight problem solving". Cognition. 89 (2): 133–155. doi:10.1016/S0010-0277(03)00098-2. ISSN 0010-0277. PMID 12915298.
