= Stanislas Dehaene =

French cognitive neuroscientist and mathematician

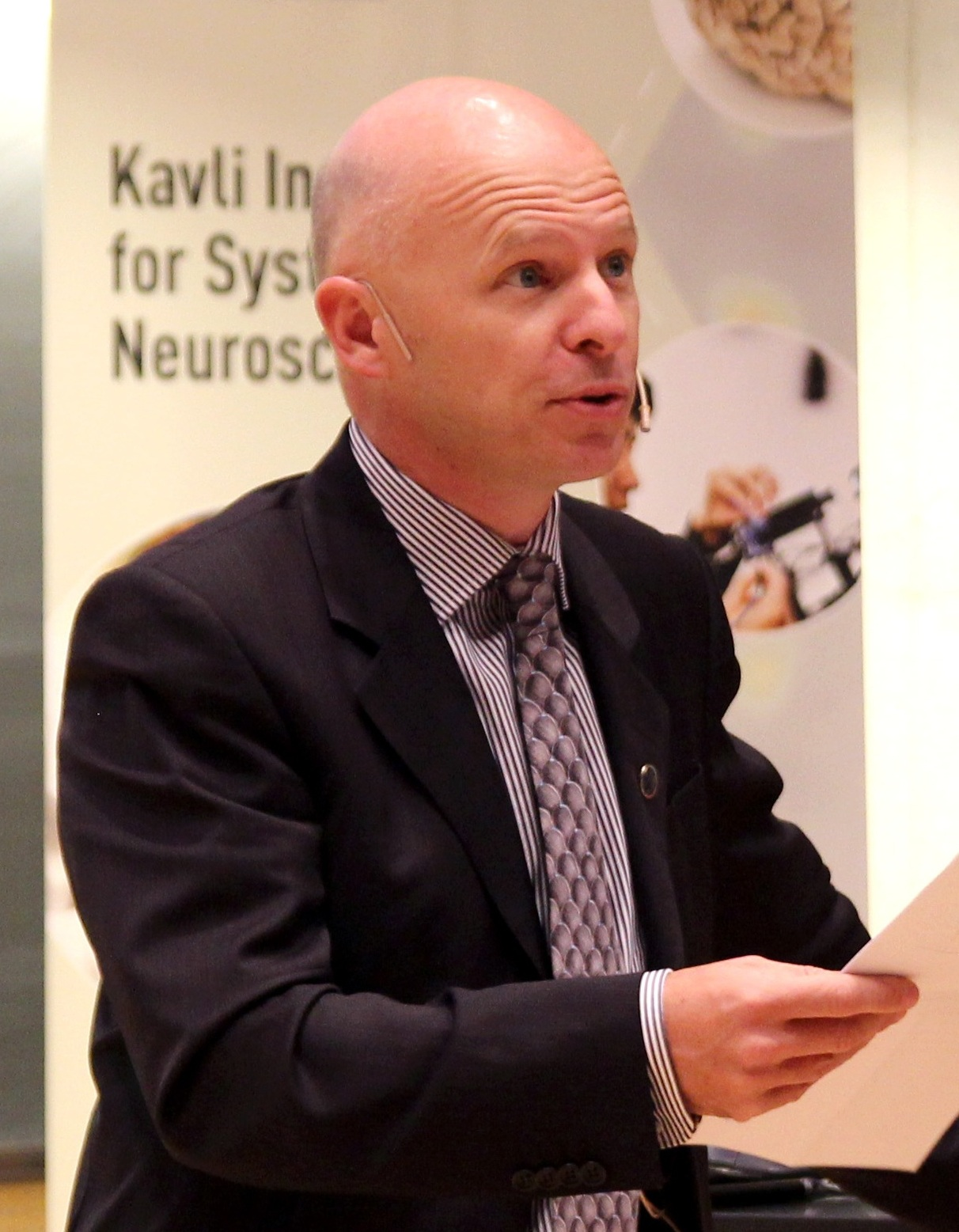
- Dehaene in 2014
- Born: 12 May 1965 (age 61); Roubaix, France
- Education: École normale supérieure University of Paris VI
- Known for: Numerical cognition, Neural correlates of reading and consciousness
- Awards: James S. McDonnell Foundation "Genius Award", Louis D. Prize, Prix Jean Rostand (for La Bosse des Maths)
- Scientific career
- Fields: Cognitive Neuroscience
- Workplaces: INSERM Unit 562 "Cognitive Neuroimaging" (director); Collège de France (professor)
- Doctoral advisor: Jacques Mehler

Stanislas Dehaene (born 12 May 1965) is a French author, cognitive neuroscientist and Mathematician whose research centers on a number of topics, including numerical cognition, the neural basis of reading and the neural correlates of consciousness. As of 2017, he is a professor at the Collège de France and, since 1989, the director of INSERM Unit 562, "Cognitive Neuroimaging".

Dehaene was one of ten people to be awarded the James S. McDonnell Foundation Centennial Fellowship in 1999 for his work on the "Cognitive Neuroscience of Numeracy". In 2003, together with Denis Le Bihan, Dehaene was awarded the Grand Prix scientifique de la Fondation Louis D. from the Institut de France. He was elected to the American Philosophical Society in 2010. In 2014, together with Giacomo Rizzolatti and Trevor Robbins, he was awarded the Brain Prize.

Dehaene is an associate editor of the journal Cognition, and a member of the editorial board of several other journals, including NeuroImage, PLoS Biology, Developmental Science, and Neuroscience of Consciousness.

== Early life and education ==
Dehaene studied mathematics at the École Normale Supérieure in Paris from 1984 to 1989. He obtained his master's degree in Applied mathematics and computer science in 1985 from the University of Paris VI.

He turned to neuroscience and psychology after reading Jean-Pierre Changeux's book, L'Homme neuronal (Neuronal Man: The Biology of The Mind).

Dehaene began to collaborate on computational neuronal models of human cognition, including working memory and task control, collaborations which continue to the present day. Dehaene completed his PhD in Experimental Psychology in 1989 with Jacques Mehler at the École des Hautes Études en Sciences Sociales (EHESS), Paris.

== Career ==
After receiving his doctorate, Dehaene became a research scientist at INSERM in the Cognitive Sciences and Psycholinguistics Laboratory (Laboratoire de Sciences Cognitives et Psycholinguistique) directed by Mehler. He spent two years, from 1992 to 1994, as a post-doctoral fellow at the Institute of Cognitive and Decision Sciences, with Michael Posner at the University of Oregon.

Dehaene returned to France in 1997 to serve as Research Director at INSERM (French National Institute of Health and Medical Research) through 2005. He subsequently began his own research group, which today numbers nearly 30 graduate students, post-doctoral fellows and researchers. In 2005, he was elected to the newly created Chair of Experimental Cognitive Psychology at the Collège de France.

== Work ==
=== Numerical cognition ===
Dehaene is best known for his work on numerical cognition, a discipline which he popularized and synthesized with the publication of his 1997 book, The Number Sense (La Bosse des maths) which won the Prix Jean-Rostand for best French language general-audience scientific book. He began his studies of numerical cognition with Jacques Mehler, examining the cross-linguistic frequency of number words, whether numbers were understood in an analog or compositional manner, and the connection between numbers and space (the "SNARC effect"). With Changeux, he then developed a computational model of numerical abilities, which predicted log-gaussian tuning functions for number neurons, a finding which has now been elegantly confirmed with single-unit physiology

With long-time collaborator Laurent Cohen, a neurologist at the Pitié-Salpêtrière Hospital in Paris, Dehaene also identified patients with lesions in different regions of the parietal lobe with impaired multiplication, but preserved subtraction (associated with lesions of the inferior parietal lobule) and others with impaired subtraction, but preserved multiplication (associated with lesions to the intraparietal sulcus). This double dissociation suggested that different neural substrates for overlearned, linguistically mediated calculations, like multiplication, are mediated by inferior parietal regions, while on-line computations, like subtraction are mediated by the intraparietal sulcus. Shortly thereafter, Dehaene began EEG and functional neuroimaging studies of these capacities, showing that parietal and frontal regions were specifically involved in mathematical cognition, including the dissociation between subtraction and multiplication observed in his previous patient studies.

Together with Pierre Pica, and Elizabeth Spelke, Stanislas Dehaene has studied the numeracy and numeral expressions of the Mundurucu (an indigenous tribe living in Para, Brazil).

=== Consciousness ===
Dehaene subsequently turned his attention to work on the neural correlates of consciousness, leading to numerous scientific articles, an edited book, "The Cognitive Neuroscience of Consciousness" and is the Past President of the Association for the Scientific Study of Consciousness. Dehaene, together with Jean-Pierre Changeux, has developed computational models of consciousness, based on Bernard Baars's Global Workspace Theory, which suggest that only one piece of information can gain access to a "global neuronal workspace". To explore the neural basis of this global neuronal workspace, he has conducted functional neuroimaging experiments of masking and the attentional blink, which show that information that reaches conscious awareness leads to increased activation in a network of parietal and frontal regions. However, some of his work on this subject has been called into question due to a methodological flaw in the "standard reasoning of unconscious priming".

=== Neural basis of reading ===
In addition, Dehaene has used brain imaging to study language processing in monolingual and bilingual subjects, and in collaboration with Laurent Cohen, the neural basis of reading. Dehaene and Cohen initially focused on the role of ventral stream regions in visual word recognition, and in particular the role of the left inferior temporal cortex for reading written words. They identified a region they called the "visual word form area" (VWFA) that was consistently activated during reading, and also found that when this region was surgically removed to treat patients with intractable epilepsy, reading abilities were severely impaired.

Dehaene, Cohen and colleagues have subsequently demonstrated that, rather than being a single area, the VWFA is the highest stage in a hierarchy of visual feature extraction for letter and word recognition.

More recently, they have turned their attention to how learning to read may depend on a process of "neuronal recycling" that causes brain circuits originally evolved for object recognition to become tuned to recognize frequent letters, pairs of letters and words, and have tested these ideas examining brain responses in a group of adults who did not learn to read due to social and cultural constraints.

== Bibliography ==
=== As editor ===
- Dehaene, S. (Ed.) Numerical Cognition. Oxford, Blackwell. ISBN 1-55786-444-6.
- Dehaene, S. (Ed.) Le Cerveau en action: l'imagerie cérébrale en psychologie cognitive. Paris: Presses Universitaires de France, 1997. ISBN 2-13-048270-8.
- Dehaene, S. (Ed.) The Cognitive Neuroscience of Consciousness. MIT Press, 2001. ISBN 0-262-54131-9.
- Dehaene, S. Duhamel, J.R., Hauser, M. and Rizzolatti, G. (Ed.) From Monkey Brain to Human Brain. Cambridge, MA: MIT Press, 2005. ISBN 0-262-04223-1.

=== As author ===
- La Bosse des maths. Paris: Odile Jacob, 1997. ISBN 2-7381-0442-8.
- The number sense. New York: Oxford University Press, 1997; Cambridge (UK): Penguin press, 1997. ISBN 0-19-511004-8.
- Vers une science de la vie mentale. Paris: Fayard, 2007. (Inaugural Lecture at the Collège de France). ISBN 2-213-63084-4.
- Les neurones de la lecture. Paris: Odile Jacob, 2007. ISBN 2-7381-1974-3.
- Reading in the brain. New York: Penguin, 2009. ISBN 0-670-02110-5 .
- Consciousness and the Brain: Deciphering How the Brain Codes Our Thoughts. Viking Adult, 2014. ISBN 978-0-670-02543-5.
- Le Code de la conscience, Paris: Odile Jacob, 2014, ISBN 978-2738131058
- How We Learn: Why Brains Learn Better Than Any Machine . . . for Now. Viking, 2020. ISBN 978-0525559887.

== Personal life ==
Dehaene is married to Ghislaine Dehaene-Lambertz. Together they have three sons.
