= Pierre Pica =

French linguist (born 1951)

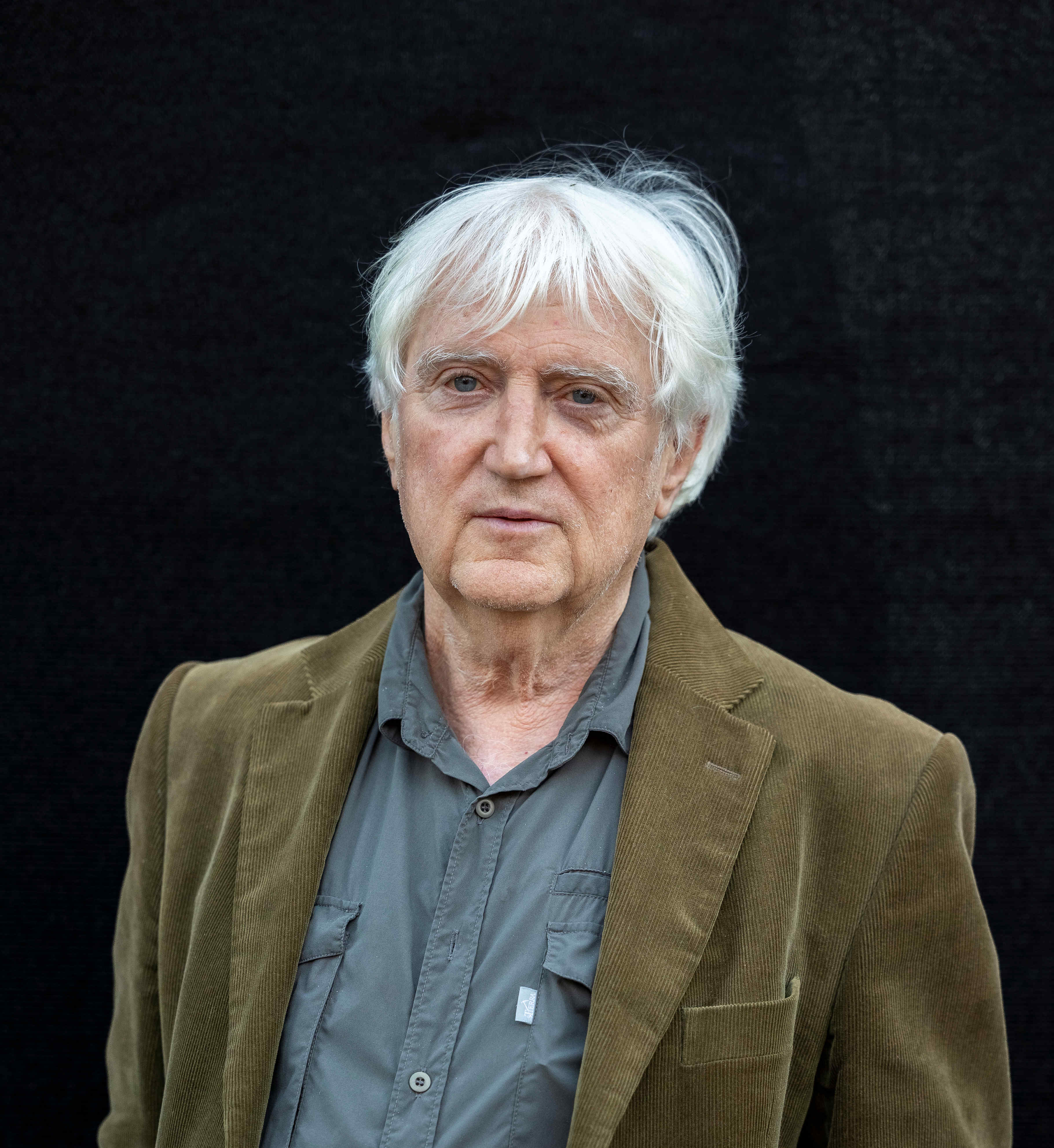
- Pica in 2022 by Thierry Hugon
- Born: 5 January 1951 (age 75); Nice, France
- Citizenship: French
- Scientific career
- Workplaces: CNRS

Pierre Pica (born 5 January 1951) is a research associate (Chargé de Recherche) at the National Center for Scientific Research in Paris. Associated Professor with the Brain Institute of the Federal University of Rio Grande do Norte, he is a specialist in theoretical linguistics and more specifically of comparative syntax.

== Research career ==
Dr. Pica has concentrated his research on the notion of parameters in linguistic. He has also shown that the respective properties of reflexive pronouns could be derived from their morphological properties. He is currently studying the distinction between the internal and external aspects of the Faculty of language and is also working on a fine grained distinction between competence and linguistic performance.

Over the last twenty years, Pica has risen to prominence as a result of his work on Binding Theory and evidentiality. More recently he has been working on Mundurucu (an indigenous language spoken in Para (Brazil). He is currently collaborating with Stanislas Dehaene and Elizabeth Spelke in a study of numerical expressions and enumeration in Mundurucu. This research stresses the importance of these data for the study of the interaction of the Language Faculty and restricted set of pre-verbal 'core knowledge'. This research which stresses the importance of the notion of culture gap, as defined by Kenneth Hale (1975)'s seminal work, stands in opposition to the hypothesis related to relativism as derived from Sapir and Whorf in that it tends to demonstrate that knowledge, even culture, can in part be reduced to a small set of universal principles and intuitions. The research has given rise to a series of publications in Science magazine.
