= Agnes Melinda Kovacs =

Psychologist, linguist and cognitive scientist

Agnes Melinda Kovacs (Hungarian: Kovács Ágnes Melinda) is a Hungarian psychologist, linguist and cognitive scientist based at the Central European University.

== Education, career and honours ==
Kovacs received an MSc in psychology from Babeș-Bolyai University in Cluj-Napoca, Romania, in 2002, then studied for a PhD at the International School for Advanced Studies (SISSA) in Trieste, Italy, which she received in 2008. Her doctoral studies focused on bilingualism and theory of mind.

From 2008 to 2010 she was a postdoctoral researcher at the Institute for Psychology of the Hungarian Academy of Sciences, supported by a Marie Curie research fellowship. In 2010 she moved to the Central European University to continue her postdoctoral research at the Cognitive Development Center there.

In 2012 Kovacs was the recipient of a European Research Council Starting Grant for her project REPCOLLAB (Representational preconditions for understanding other minds in the service of human collaboration and social learning), which she carried out at the Central European University (CEU). She was promoted to Research Fellow in 2015 and took up a position as associate professor in 2017. She is currently director of the Cognitive Development Center at CEU.

In 2019 Kovacs was elected ordinary member of the Academia Europaea.

== Research ==
Kovacs's team combines methods from cognitive neuroscience with ideas from philosophy of mind. Their focus is on understanding the minds of others, and they conduct neuroimaging and behavioural experiments on infants and adults. In her early work, conducted with Jacques Mehler among others, she investigated the effects of bilingualism on executive functions and on false-belief reasoning.

== Selected publications ==
- Kovacs, Agnes Melinda. 2009. Early bilingualism enhances mechanisms of false-belief reasoning. Developmental science 12 (1), 48–54. doi:10.1111/j.1467-7687.2008.00742.x
- Kovacs, Agnes Melinda, and Jacques Mehler. 2009. Cognitive gains in 7-month-old bilingual infants. Proceedings of the National Academy of Sciences 106 (16), 6556–6560. doi:10.1073/pnas.0811323106
- Kovacs, Agnes Melinda, and Jacques Mehler. 2009. Flexible learning of multiple speech structures in bilingual infants. Science 325, 611–612. doi:10.1126/science.1173947
- Kovacs, Agnes Melinda, Ernő Téglás, and Ansgar Denis Endress. 2010. The social sense: Susceptibility to others' beliefs in human infants and adults. Science 330, 1830–1834. doi:10.1126/science.1190792
- Kovacs, Agnes Melinda, Tibor Tauzin, Ernő Téglás, György Gergely and Gergely Csibra. 2014. Pointing as epistemic request: 12-month-olds point to receive new information. Infancy 19 (6), 543–547. doi:10.1111/infa.12060
