= Higher-order theories of consciousness =

Scientific theory

Higher-order theories of consciousness postulate that consciousness consists in perceptions or thoughts about first-order mental states. In particular, phenomenal consciousness is thought to be a higher-order representation of perceptual or quasi-perceptual contents, such as visual images.

Higher-order theories are distinguished from other cognitive/representational accounts of consciousness which suggest that merely first-order mentality of certain sorts constitutes consciousness.

== Types ==
=== Higher-order perception theory ===
Also called inner-sense theory, this version of higher-order theory proposes that phenomenal consciousness consists not in immediate sensations but in higher-level sensing of those sensations. Or put another way:

A phenomenally conscious mental state is a state with analog/non-conceptual intentional content, which is in turn the target of a higher-order analog/non-conceptual intentional state, via the operations of a faculty of 'inner sense'.

One motivation for this approach is that it accounts for phenomenal consciousness absent beliefs or behaviors associated with those experiences—so that, e.g., someone could feel pain without necessarily exhibiting functional reactions to pain.

=== Actualist higher-order thought theory ===
David Rosenthal is a foremost advocate of this view. It claims that a mental state is conscious when it is the subject of a higher-order thought (HOT). Phenomenal consciousness in particular corresponds to certain kinds of mental states (e.g., visual inputs) that are the subjects of HOTs. Rosenthal excludes the special case in which one learns about one's lower-order states by conscious deduction. For instance, if psychoanalysis could reveal one's unconscious motives, this would not suddenly make them conscious.

=== Dispositionalist higher-order thought theory ===
The dispositionalist mirrors the actualist view except that the first-order mental state need not actually be thought about—it only needs to be available to potentially be thought about.

While actualist accounts would seem to require immense higher-order computation on all first-order percepts, dispositionalist accounts do not; They merely require availability of first-order information. Such availability could come from, e.g., global broadcasting as in the Global Workspace Theory.

=== Self-representational higher-order theories ===
Self-representational higher-order theories consider the higher-order state to be constitutive or internal to its first-order state. This may be either because:

1. the first-order and higher-order states are identical, with the same state serving two different roles, or
2. the first-order and higher-order states are part of the same whole, and the whole complex is what becomes conscious.

An example of the second, "part-whole" self-representational theory is Vincent Picciuto's "quotational theory of consciousness" in which consciousness consists of "mentally quoting" a first-order perception.

=== Higher-order statistical inference view ===
In this theory, higher-level processing determines that a first-order representation is reliable.

=== Radical plasticity thesis ===
Similar to a HOT view, this theory proposes that the brain "learns" when there exists a trustworthy lower-level representation.

== Scientific perspectives ==
Higher-order theories originated in philosophy, but they have also gained some scientific defenders. Here are some examples of evidence supporting higher-order views:

- Reporting of conscious experience seems in some studies to occur serially following unconscious processing rather than in parallel with it.
- Unconscious processing is quite powerful on its own, so it is not obvious that task performance requires consciousness. Higher-order views agree with this, unlike, e.g., global-workspace views.
- Impairments to the prefrontal cortex may impair subjective reports without affecting task performance. If the prefrontal cortex were mainly serving an attentional role, performance should degrade along with reportability.
- Some interpretations of certain disorders of consciousness suggest that they operate by affecting the prefrontal cortex, where higher-order thoughts are assumed to take place.

Edmund Rolls defends a higher-order account of consciousness. He argues that consciousness consists in higher-order thoughts allowing one to monitor and correct errors and "that the brain systems that are required for consciousness and language are similar." Qualia like pain become conscious when "they enter into a specialized linguistic symbol-manipulation system, which is part of a higher-order thought system" that helps with, inter alia, "flexible planning of actions."

== Motivation ==
Higher-order theory can account for the distinction between unconscious and conscious brain processing. Both types of mental operations involve first-order manipulations, and according to higher-order theory, what makes cognition conscious is a higher-order observation of the first-order processing.

In neuroscience terms, higher-order theory is motivated by the distinction between first-order information in early sensory regions versus higher-order representations in prefrontal and parietal cortices.

== Criticisms ==
=== Against inner-sense and actualist HOT views ===
Scott Sturgeon argues against inner-sense theory on the grounds that it could give rise to disorders in which, e.g., one has a first-order perception of red which mis-triggers a second-order sense of "looks orange". But we do not see any such disorders in neurology. More generally, inner-sense and actualist views face the "targetless higher-order representation problem" in which there might be, e.g., a higher-order experience/thought about perceiving red without a corresponding first-order redness percept. One reply is that this is no more a problem for higher-order theories than for other neuroscientific theories of consciousness, which also involve many layers of processing that could theoretically be inconsistent.

Peter Carruthers points out that inner sense or actualist HOTs about first-order percepts might greatly increase the computing power required to consciously process stimuli, for not only does one need to have a perception, but one then needs to have another (perhaps highly detailed) perception or thought about that perception.
