= Pure alexia =

Condition of having severe reading issues but with all other language skills intact

Pure alexia, also known as agnosic alexia or alexia without agraphia or pure word blindness, is one form of alexia which makes up "the peripheral dyslexia" group. Individuals who have pure alexia have severe reading problems while other language-related skills such as naming, oral repetition, auditory comprehension or writing are typically intact.

Pure alexia is also known as: "alexia without agraphia", "letter-by-letter dyslexia", "spelling dyslexia", or "word-form dyslexia". Another name for it is "Dejerine syndrome", after Joseph Jules Dejerine, who described it in 1892; however, when using this name, it should not be confused with medial medullary syndrome which shares the same eponym.

== Classification ==
Pure alexia results from cerebral lesions in circumscribed brain regions and therefore belongs to the group of acquired reading disorders, alexia, as opposed to developmental dyslexia found in children who have difficulties in learning to read.

== Causes ==
Pure alexia almost always involves an infarct to the left posterior cerebral artery (which perfuses the splenium of the corpus callosum and left visual cortex, among other things). The resulting deficit will be pure alexia – i.e., the patient can write but cannot read (even what they have just written). However, because pure alexia affects visual input, not auditory input, patients with pure alexia can recognize words that are spelled out loud to them. This is because the left visual cortex has been damaged, leaving only the right visual cortex (occipital lobe) able to process visual information, but it is unable to send this information to the language areas (Broca's area, Wernicke's area, etc.) in the left brain because of the damage to the splenium of the corpus callosum. Patients with this deficit mostly do have a stroke to the posterior cerebral artery. But they may be susceptible to pure alexia as a consequence of other traumatic brain injuries (TBIs) as well. Anything that stops proper blood flow to the area necessary for normal reading abilities will cause a form of alexia. The posterior cerebral artery is a main locale for the cause of this deficit because this artery is not just responsible for itself, it also supplies the anterior temporal branches, the posterior temporal branches, the calcarine branch, and the parieto-occipital branch. What is important about these arteries is their location. All of them supply blood to the back outer parts of the brain. This part of the brain is also referred to as the posterior lateral part of the brain. In cases of pure alexia, locations are found in the section of the brain, specifically the temporo-occipital area. This is the area that is activated when people without any sort of alexia receive activation when undergoing orthographic processing. This area is known as the visual word form area due to this pattern of activation. The patient can still write because the pathways connecting the left-sided language areas to the motor areas are intact. However, many people with pure alexia are able to identify and name individual letters over time as well as recognize sequences of letters as words. These people typically adapt to their disability and are able to use a style of compensatory reading known as letter-by-letter reading. This style of reading takes longer than the conventional style of reading does. As the number of letters in a word increases, the amount of time it takes for the person with pure alexia increases. For each letter that is added, a patient may take up to an additional three seconds to read the word.

Studies have shown that pure alexia may be a result of a disconnection syndrome. Analysis of diffusion images showed that the visual word form area (VWFA) is connected to the occipital lobe via the inferior longitudinal fasciculus (ILF), a projection that runs between the temporal and occipital lobe. functional magnetic resonance imaging (fMRI) and Diffusion Tensor Imaging (DTI) showed that two weeks after surgery in the ILF, the VWFA-Occipital Lobe tract was severely degenerated. The results came from an epileptic patient who showed symptoms of pure alexia after his surgery. Thus, the proposed pathophysiological mechanism is that the ILF lesion interferes with transmission of visual information to the VWFA. There is, however, an alternative view that suggests the "VWFA" is devoted to processing of high acuity foveal input, which is particularly salient for complex visual stimuli like letter strings. Studies have highlighted disrupted processing of non-linguistic visual stimuli after damage to the left pFG, both for familiar and unfamiliar objects

Pure alexia exhibits some unexpected residual abilities despite the inability to read words. For instance, one patient had preserved calculation capabilities such as deciding which number was greater, and whether a number was odd or even with greater than chance probability. The study showed that the patient was also able to calculate simple arithmetic tasks such as addition, subtraction, and division, but not multiplication, even though the patient could not read the numbers. For example, the patient would be presented with "8 – 6", and he or she would read it as "five minus four", but still come up with the correct answer "two" with greater than chance accuracy. Pure alexia patients also seem to retain some residual semantic processing. They are able to perform better than chance when forced to make a lexical decision or make a semantic-categorisation decision. These subjects also performed better with nouns than functors, better with words that had high rather than low imageability, and performed poorly with suffixes. However, this may be due to right hemisphere input or residual left hemisphere input.

== Research ==
In patients, a common symptom is letter-by-letter reading or LBL. This action is a compensatory strategy which these patients use in order to come up with a semblance of reading. It is essentially looking at the consonants and vowels of the word and sounding them out as they sound. However, this method does not always work, especially for words like 'phone' where the ph sounds like an f, but if sounded out, does not sound like an f. Also, by reading words in the fashion, the rate at which patients read words is much slower compared to people who do not have this disability. Petersen et al. proved that the issue of reading time had more to do with the length of the words than reading ability. The team had 4 patients with right hemisphere damage and 4 patients with left hemisphere damage in the temporo-occipital lobes as well as 26 controls were shown one word at a time on a screen. They were exposed to 20 words of 3 and 5 letters, 12 words of 7 letters. The subjects were asked to read the words as quickly and as accurately as possible. The patients with left hemisphere lesions consistently read the longer words slower than the controls despite the difficulty of the word. It is thought that as the word gets longer, the letters on the outsides of the word go into peripheral vision, making the patient shift their attention thus making the patient take longer to read.

== Rehabilitation ==
Though there have been ample attempts to rehabilitate patients with pure alexia, few have proven to be effective on a large scale. Most rehabilitation practices have been specialized to a single patient or small patient group. At the simplest level, patients seeking rehabilitation are asked to practice reading words aloud repeatedly. This is meant to stimulate the damaged system of the brain. This is known as multiple oral re-reading (MOR) treatment. This is a text-based approach that is implemented in order to prevent patients from LBL reading. MOR works by reading aloud the same text repeatedly until certain criteria are reached. The most important criteria for a pure alexic patient is reading at an improved rate. The treatment aims to shift patients away from the LBL reading strategy by strengthening links between visual input and the associated orthographic representations. This repetition supports the idea of using top-down processing initially minimize the effects peripheral processing which were demonstrated in the study above. From here, the goal is to increase bottom-up processing. This will hopefully aid in word recognition and promote interactive processing of all available information to support reading. 'The supported reading stimulation from MOR has a rehabilitative effect so that reading rate and accuracy are better for untrained text, and word-form recognition improves as evidenced by a reduced word-length effect.' These tactics have seen quite good success. Another tactic that has been employed is the use of cross modal therapy. In this therapy, patients are asked to trace the words in which they are trying to read aloud. There has been success using cross modal therapy such as kinaesthetic or motor-cross cuing therapy, but tends to be a more feasible approach for those on the slower reading end of the spectrum.
