= Lionel Naccache =

French neurologist (born 1969)

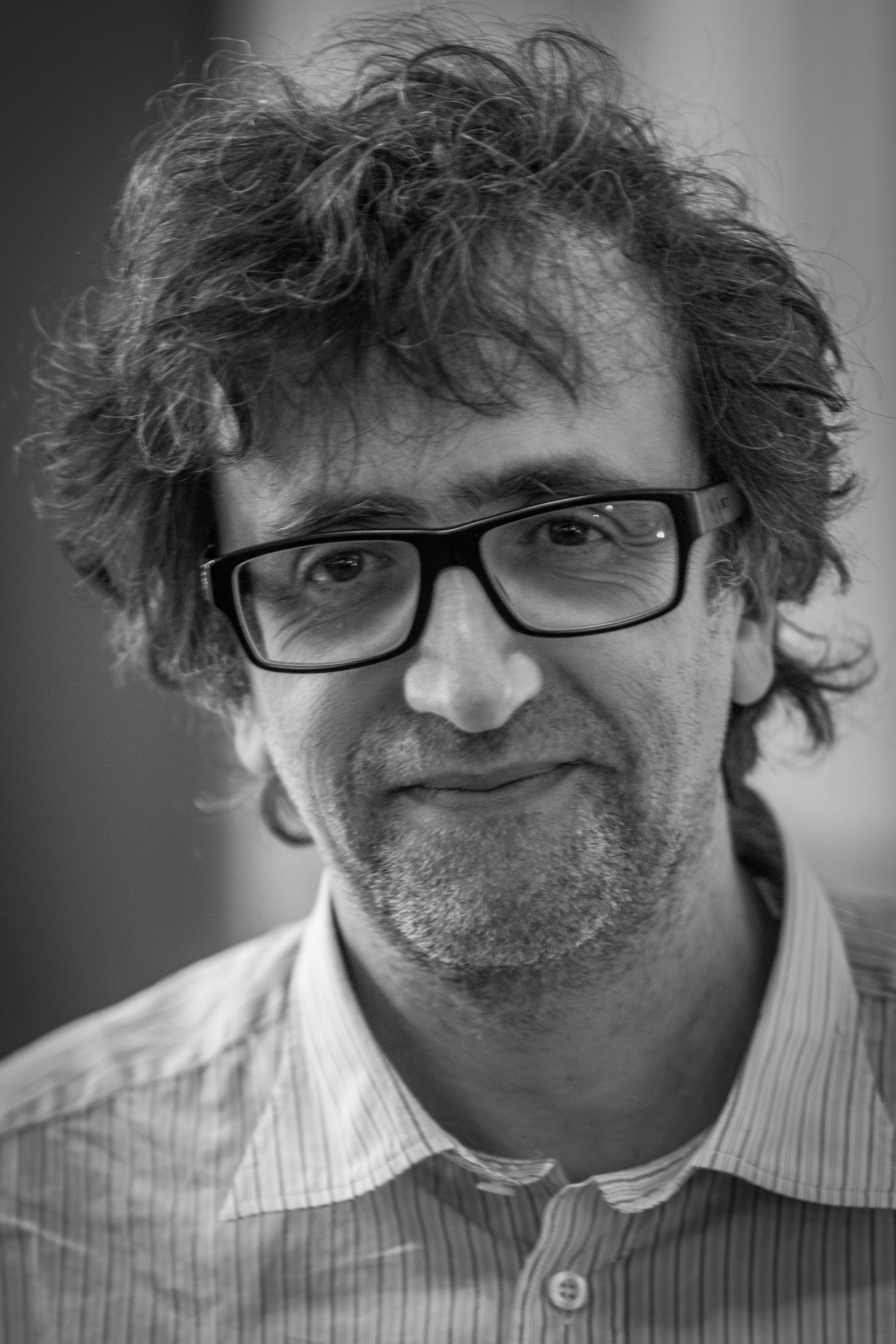
- Lionel Naccache in 2014
- Born: 27 March 1969 (age 56); Sarcelles, France
- Occupation: Neurologist

Lionel Naccache (born 27 March 1969 in Sarcelles) is a French neurologist and specialist in cognitive neuroscience.
