= Cognition (journal) =

Peer-reviewed scientific journal

- Discipline: Cognitive sciences
- Language: English
- Edited by: Tamara Swaab

Publication details
- History: 1975–present
- Publisher: Elsevier
- Frequency: Bimonthly
- Open access: Hybrid
- Impact factor: 3.650 (2020)

Standard abbreviations
- ISO 4: Cognition

Indexing
- CODEN: CGTNAU
- ISSN: 0010-0277
- LCCN: 79646376
- OCLC no.: 38537176

Links
- Journal homepage; Online access

Cognition: International Journal of Cognitive Science is a bimonthly peer-reviewed scientific journal covering cognitive science. It was established in 1972 and is published by Elsevier.

== History ==
Cognition is one of the few psychology journals of the 20th century that developed outside of the United States. The journal, founded by Jacques Mehler and Thomas Bever in 1972, was initially published quarterly, then every other month from 1982, and finally on a monthly basis since 1985.

Work in the journal is considered "highly cited," and is noted to adequately represent research on an international level. In terms of representing topics within the cognitive sciences, a 2005 meta-analysis demonstrated that the journal primarily publishes work in psychology, with a small proportion of publications in linguistics and neuroscience. The analysis concluded that for several reasons, including the explicit editorial policy of the journal and efforts to create special issues for specific disciplines, the disparity could not be well explained by editorial bias.
