= Jacques Mehler =

French psychologist and academic (1936–2020)

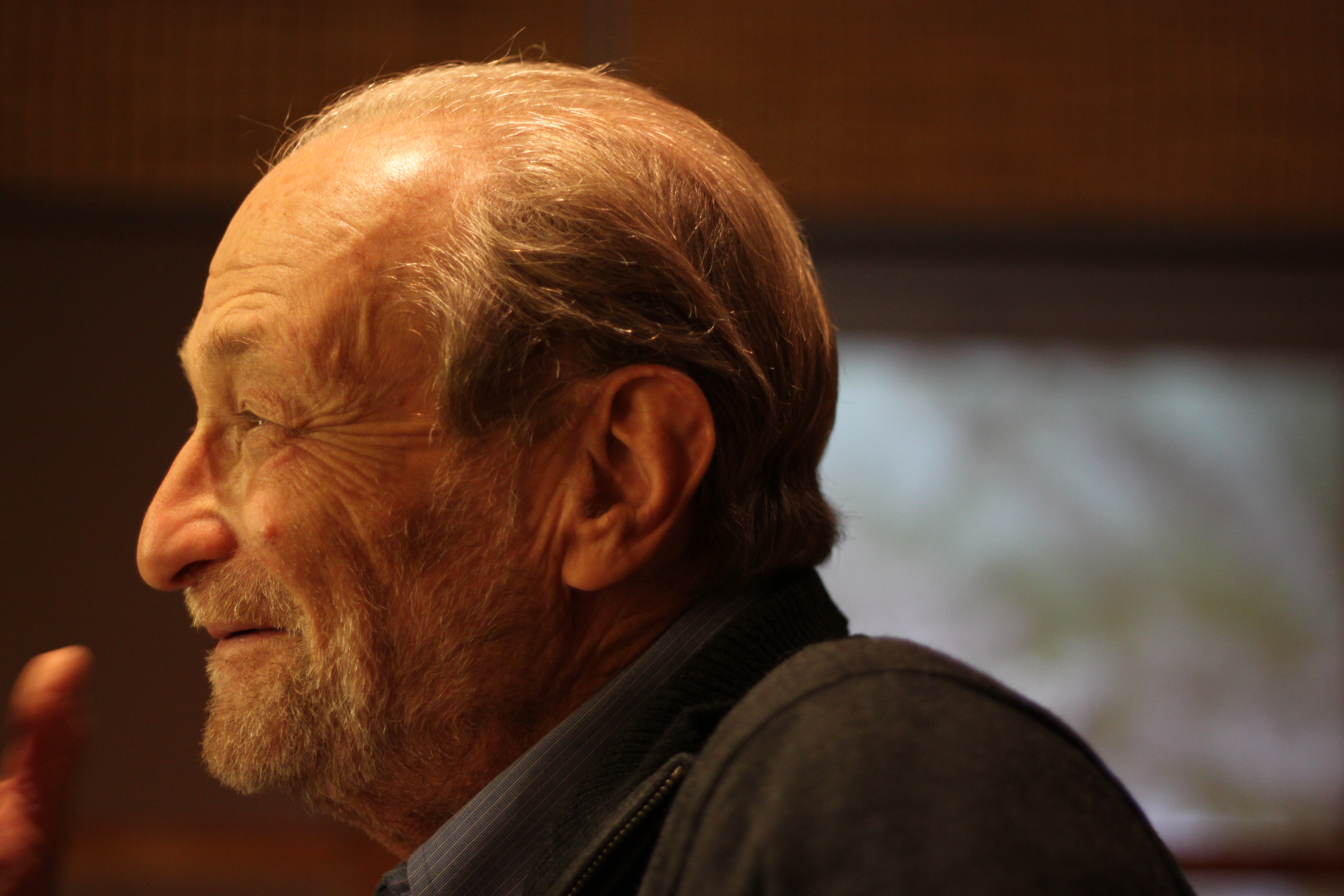
- Born: August 17, 1936; Barcelona
- Died: February 11, 2020 (aged 83)
- Education: Harvard University
- Scientific career
- Fields: Cognitive neuroscience
- Thesis: How some sentences are remembered (1964)
- Academic advisors: George Armitage Miller
- Website: www.sissa.it/cns/lcd/jacques.htm

Jacques Mehler (17 August 1936 – 11 February 2020) was a cognitive psychologist specializing in language acquisition.

== Education ==
Mehler studied chemistry and obtained his Licenciatura en Ciencias Quimicas at the Universidad de Buenos Aires from 1952 to 1958. After that, he went to Oxford University and University College of London where he obtained his B.Sc. degree in 1959. From 1961 to 1964, he studied at Harvard University, at the time of the cognitive revolution, where he worked with George A. Miller and obtained a PhD. in psychology.

== Career ==
Mehler was Emeritus at the École des Hautes Études en Sciences Sociales, where he directed the Laboratoire de Sciences Cognitives et Psycholinguistique (LSCP); he was also the head of the Language, Cognition and Development lab at the International School for Advanced Studies (SISSA) in Trieste (Italy). In 1982, He became a member of the Max Planck Institute for Psycholinguistics' Scientific Council in 1982. He was editor-in-chief of the journal Cognition until 2007. Mehler was elected a foreign honorary member of the American Academy of Arts and Sciences in 2001, a Fellow of the American Association for the Advancement of Science in 2003, and an international member of the American Philosophical Society in 2009.

== Research ==
Jacques Mehler devoted most of his career to language processing and language acquisition. Early on, he and his colleagues discovered that 2-year-olds display previously unsuspected cognitive capacities, providing alternative explanations for Piagetian demonstrations, and contributed to a shift from the constructivist viewpoint toward biologically grounded theories that required validation with much younger infants.

While at the CNRS in France, he established collaborations with the Cochin-Baudeloque maternity, where they created a laboratory to study the core dispositions in neonates. These studies helped to understand precursors of language learning in neonates, such as recognizing their mother's voice, perceiving speech streams as a sequence of syllables, distinguishing lists of bisyllabic items from lists of trisyllabic items, and computing rhythmic properties of speech utterances.

These findings helped formulate bootstrapping accounts of language acquisition. Rhythmical computations became a central topic of his subsequent research. Further, he and his students explored the brain structures involved in language processing using brain-imaging devices – PET, MRI, and eventually Near-Infrared Spectroscopy. One of their early results was to demonstrate a left-lateralized response to speech over backward-speech in newborns.

In 2001 he moved to SISSA-ISAS, in Trieste, Italy, where he established the Language, Cognition and Development (LCD) laboratory, to pursue studies of the mind/brain system during early development. He organized a neonate-testing unit in Udine at the University Hospital and helped develop a Near Infrared Spectroscopy brain-imaging laboratory to explore the mind/brain mechanisms in neonates.

In Trieste, his group became interested in how the process of statistical, or distributional learning (a non-language-specific mechanism) in infants might interact with their capacity of extracting and generalizing algebraic-like structures from their perceptual input. Subsequently, the group developed an interest in how speech prosody contributes to the process of language acquisition. Jacques and his group showed that prosody provides perceptible domains that constrain the acquisition process.

Further, along with Marina Nespor and other colleagues, they hypothesized that vowels and consonants play different roles in language processing and acquisition, a proposal that has given rise to a host of experimental investigations revealing functional differences between vowels and consonants, even in infancy.

Along with his students and collaborators, Jacques also explored adult speech processing, arithmetic abilities, music, social cognition, executive functions in bilingual infants, and human reasoning. For example, The Proceedings of the National Academy of Sciences (2009) describes the research conducted by Agnes Melinda Kovacs and Jacques Mehler on the cognitive gains in seven-month-old bilingual infants. In three eye-tracking studies, Kovacs and Mehler found that infants, reared with two languages from birth, display improved cognitive control abilities compared with matched monolinguals.
