= Functional disconnection =

Functional disconnection is the disintegrated function in the brain in the absence of anatomical damage, in distinction to physical disconnection of the cerebral hemispheres by surgical resection, trauma or lesion. Applications have included alexia without agraphia dyslexia, persistent vegetative state and minimally conscious state as well as autistic spectrum disorders. Functional disconnection itself is not a medically recognized condition. It is a theoretical concept used to facilitate research into the causes and symptoms within recognized conditions.

== History ==
In 1977, Witleson reported that developmental dyslexia may be associated with (i) bi-hemisphere representation of spatial functions, in contrast to the unitary right hemisphere control of these functions observed in normal individuals. The bilateral neural involvement in spatial processing may interfere with the left hemisphere's processing of its own specialized functions and result in deficient linguistic, sequential cognitive processing and in overuse of the spatial, holistic cognitive mode, reflecting a functional disconnection syndrome in these individuals confirmed by Leisman in the 1980s and in the 2000s.

The concept of functional disconnection developed further with Stachowiak and Poeck in 1976. who reported on a case in 1976 of a 67-yr-old male with hemianopia resulting from a cerebrovascular accident resulting in pure alexia and a color naming deficit that he suggested was due to a functional disconnection mechanism. He noted that the underlying disconnection mechanism is improved by the facilitating effect of unblocking methods (in the tactile, somesthetic, auditory, and visual systems), so that pathways other than the one impaired by the brain lesion are used.

In 1998, Fritson presented a mechanistic account of how dysfunctional integration among neuronal systems arises, based on the central role played by synaptic plasticity in shaping the connections. He hypothesized that the pathophysiology of schizophrenia is expressed at the level of modulation of associative changes in synaptic efficacy; specifically the modulation of plasticity in those brain systems responsible for emotional learning and emotional memory in the postnatal period. This modulation is mediated by ascending neurotransmitter systems that: (i) have been implicated in schizophrenia; and (ii) are known to be involved in consolidating synaptic connections during learning. The pathophysiology results in a disruption of the reinforcement of adaptive behavior consistent with the disintegrative aspects of the disorder. Kim and colleagues in 2003 further described the disconnection hypothesis in schizophrenia as the result of a prefrontal-parietal lobe functional disconnection, particularly prefrontal dissociation and abnormal prefrontal-parietal interaction during working memory processing.

The concept of functional disconnection developed still further when it was applied to the understanding of the nature of autistic spectrum disorder. Geschwind and Levitt in 2007 suggested a model of the symptoms of autism in which higher-order association areas of the brain (that normally connect to the frontal lobe) are partially disconnected during development, thereby explaining the heterogeneity of autism etiology. The autism group at Cambridge University provided evidence that the functional connectivity of medial temporal lobe structures specifically is abnormal in people with Asperger's syndrome, at least during fearful face processing. Melillo and Leisman have similarly concluded that a functional disconnection syndrome is a basis for explaining the symptoms of autistic spectrum disorder.
