= Monothematic delusion =

Delusional state focused on one topic

- Specialty: Psychiatry

A monothematic delusion is a delusional state that concerns only one particular topic. This is contrasted by what is sometimes called multi-thematic or polythematic delusions where the person has a range of delusions (typically the case of schizophrenia). These disorders can occur within the context of schizophrenia or dementia or they can occur without any other signs of mental illness. When these disorders are found outside the context of mental illness, they are often caused by organic dysfunction as a result of traumatic brain injury, stroke, or neurological illness.

People who experience these delusions as a result of organic dysfunction often do not have any obvious intellectual deficiency nor do they have any other symptoms. Additionally, a few of these people even have some awareness that their beliefs are bizarre, yet they cannot be persuaded that their beliefs are false.

== Types ==
Some delusions that fall under this category are:

- Capgras delusion is the belief that (usually) a close relative or spouse has been replaced by an identical-looking impostor.
- Fregoli delusion is the belief that various people the believer meets are actually the same person in disguise.
- Intermetamorphosis is the belief that an individual has the ability to take the form of another person in both external appearance and internal personality.
- Syndrome of subjective doubles is the belief that one has a doppelgänger or double of themselves carrying out independent actions.
- Cotard's syndrome is the belief that one is dead (either figuratively or literally), does not exist, is putrefying, or have lost their blood or internal organs. In rare instances, it can include delusions of immortality.
- Mirrored-self misidentification is the belief that one's reflection in a mirror is some other person.
- Reduplicative paramnesia is the belief that a familiar person, place, object, or body part has been duplicated. For example, a person may believe that they are in fact not in the hospital to which they were admitted, but an identical-looking hospital in a different part of the country.
- Somatoparaphrenia is the belief that one's limb or an entire side of their body is not their own.

Note that some of these delusions are sometimes grouped under the umbrella term of delusional misidentification syndrome.

== Causes ==
Current cognitive neuropsychology research points toward a two-factor cause of monothematic delusions. The first factor is an anomalous experience, often due to a neurological defect. The second is an impairment of the belief formation cognitive process.

For example, the first factor in Capgras delusion is an impairment in how the brain recognizes a familiar face – specifically, how it cross-references one's feelings toward the person. A patient with this disorder can recognize a loved one's face, but seeing it does not elicit the expected emotional reaction. The patient's mind interprets this as seeing a stranger, who merely looks like their loved one.

The second factor, an impairment in the belief formation cognitive process, remains unclear as the process itself is not well-understood. And while the two-factor hypothesis is currently the dominant model, there are alternatives which do not involve a second factor.

There is evidence that delusional people are more prone to jumping to conclusions, predisposing them to accept anomalous experiences as real and make snap judgments about them. Studies have also shown that such individuals are more prone to making errors due to matching bias, showing a higher than average tendency to seek confirmation for existing beliefs as opposed to testing how well they stand up to being challenged.

These judgment biases help explain how delusion-prone people adopt and hold firm to extreme beliefs, though researchers disagree about whether they are sufficient explanation. Some posit that patients must have an additional neurological defect that affects their belief formation process. This defect is largely speculative, but would likely be located in the right hemisphere of the brain.

== See also ==
- Belief – Subjective attitude that something is true
- Cognitive neuropsychiatry
- Cognitive neuropsychology – Relation of brain structure to psychological processes
- Cognitive neuroscience
- Delusion – Fixation of holding false beliefs
- Face perception – Cognitive process of visually interpreting the human face
- Neurocognitive
- Neuropsychology – Study of the brain related to specific psychological processes and behaviors
- Philosophy of mind – Branch of philosophy
