= Cognitive neuropsychology =

Relation of brain structure to psychological processes

Cognitive neuropsychology is a branch of cognitive psychology that aims to understand how the structure and function of the brain relates to specific psychological processes. Cognitive psychology is the science that looks at how mental processes are responsible for the cognitive abilities to store and produce new memories, produce language, recognize people and objects, as well as our ability to reason and problem solve. Cognitive neuropsychology places a particular emphasis on studying the cognitive effects of brain injury or neurological illness with a view to inferring models of normal cognitive functioning. Cognitive neuropsychological methods include brain pathology, recording, stimulation, brain imaging and the study of developmental deficits. Evidence is based on case studies of individual brain damaged patients who show deficits in brain areas and from patients who exhibit double dissociations. Double dissociations involve two patients and two tasks. One patient is impaired at one task but normal on the other, while the other patient is normal on the first task and impaired on the other. For example, patient A would be poor at reading printed words while still being normal at understanding spoken words, while the patient B would be normal at understanding written words and be poor at understanding spoken words. Scientists can interpret this information to explain how there is a single cognitive module for word comprehension. From studies like these, researchers infer that different areas of the brain are highly specialised. Cognitive neuropsychology can be distinguished from cognitive neuroscience, which is also interested in brain-damaged patients, but is particularly focused on uncovering the neural mechanisms underlying cognitive processes.

== History ==
A i s Aa3
the brain or skull
in hieroglyphs
Era: 2nd Intermediate Period
(1650–1550 BC)

The connection between brain injuries and functions was first documented in the 16th century BC, in the Edwin Smith Papyrus of Ancient Egypt.

In 1522, Italian physician Jacopo Berengario da Carpi wrote in his treatise De Fractura Calvae sive Craniei that brain injuries resulted in vertigo (as well as vomiting, haemorrhages, aphasia). In 1825, French physician Jean-Baptiste Bouillaud proposed that lesions of the frontal lobe were responsible for disturbances in speech.

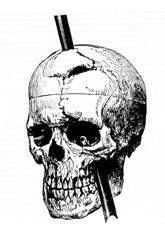
"Front and lateral view of the cranium, representing the direction in which the iron traversed its cavity..."

In 1848, Phineas Gage became a classic subject for studying the connection between the prefrontal cortex and behavior, decision-making, and consequences when an explosion accident pierced his brain with an iron rod.

Cognitive neuropsychology has its roots in the diagram-making approach to language disorder that started in the second half of the 19th century. The discovery that aphasia takes different forms depending on the location of brain damage provided a powerful framework for understanding brain function.

In 1861, Paul Broca reported a post mortem study of an aphasic patient who was speechless apart from a single nonsense word: "Tan". Broca showed that an area of the left frontal lobe was damaged. As Tan was unable to produce speech but could still understand it, Broca argued that this area might be specialised for speech production and that language skills might be localized to this cortical area. Broca did a similar study on another patient, Lelong, a few weeks later. Lelong, like Tan, could understand speech but could only repeat the same five words. After examining his brain, Broca noticed that Lelong had a lesion in approximately the same area as his patient Tan. He also noticed that in the more than 25 patients he examined with aphasia, they all had lesions to the left frontal lobe but there was no damage to the right hemisphere of the brain. From this he concluded that the function of speech was probably localized in the inferior frontal gyrus of the left hemisphere of the brain, an area now known as Broca's area.

Karl Wernicke subsequently reported patients with damage further back in the temporal lobe who could speak but were unable to understand what was said to them, providing evidence for two potentially interconnected language centres. These clinical descriptions were integrated into a theory of language organisation by Lichtheim. Subsequently, these models were used and developed to inform Dejerine's account of reading, Liepmann's theory of action and Lissauer's 1890 account of object recognition and Lewandowsky and Stadelmann's 1908 account of calculation.

Broca's area and Wernicke's area.

However, the early 20th century saw a reaction to the overly-precise accounts of the diagram-making neurologists. Pierre Marie challenged conclusions against previous evidence of Broca's areas in 1906 and Henry Head attacked the whole field of cerebral localisation 1926.

The modern science of cognitive neuropsychology emerged during the 1960s stimulated by the insights of the neurologist Norman Geschwind who demonstrated that the insights of Broca and Wernicke were still clinically relevant. The other stimulus to the discipline was the cognitive revolution and the growing science of cognitive psychology which had emerged as a reaction to behaviorism in the mid-20th century. Psychologists in the mid-1950s acknowledged that the structure of mental information-processing systems could be investigated in scientifically acceptable ways. They developed and applied new cognitive processing models to explain experimental data from not only studies of speech and language but also those of selective attention. Cognitive psychologists and clinical neuropsychologists developed more research collaborations to gain a better understanding of these disorders. The rebirth of neuropsychology was marked by the publishing of two seminal collaborative papers from Marshall & Newcombe (1966) on reading and Warrington & Shallice (1969) on memory. Subsequently, work by pioneers such as Elizabeth Warrington, Brenda Milner, Tim Shallice, Alan Baddeley and Lawrence Weiskrantz demonstrated that neurological patients were an important source of data for cognitive psychologists.

It took less than one decade for neuropsychology to be fully re-established. More achievements in neuropsychology were recognized: the establishment of the first major book discussing neuropsychology using a cognitive approach, Deep Dyslexia, in 1980 after a scientific meeting about the topic in Oxford in 1977, the birth of the Cognitive Neuropsychology journal in 1984, and the publishing of the first textbook of neuropsychology, Human Cognitive Neuropsychology in 1988.

A particular area of interest was memory. Patients with amnesia caused by injuries to the hippocampus in the temporal cortex and midbrain areas (especially the mamillary bodies) were of early interest. A patient with severe case of amnesia will not be able to remember meeting the examiner if they leave the room and return, let alone events of the previous day (episodic memory), but they will still be able to learn how to tie their shoes (procedural memory), remember a series of numbers for a few seconds (short-term memory or working memory) and be able to recall historical events they have learned in school (semantic memory). By contrast, patients may lose their short-term memory abilities while retaining their long term memory functions. Many other studies like this have been done in the field of neuropsychology examining lesions and the effect they have on certain areas of the brain and their functions.

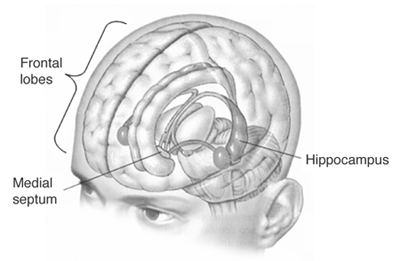
Most of Molaison's hippocampus was removed bilaterally.

Studies on the amnesic patient Henry Molaison, formerly known as patient H.M., are commonly cited as some of the precursors, if not the beginning of modern cognitive neuropsychology. Molaison had parts of his medial temporal lobes surgically removed to treat intractable epilepsy in 1953. Much of the hippocampus was also removed along with the medial temporal lobes. The treatment proved successful in reducing his dangerous seizures, but left him with a profound but selective amnesia. After the surgery, Molaison was able to remember some big events from before the surgery, such as the stock market crash in 1929, but was confused about many others and could no longer form new memories. This accidental experiment showed scientists how the brain processes different types of memory. Because Molaison's impairment was caused by surgery, the damaged parts of his brain were known, information which was usually not knowable in a time before accurate neuroimaging became widespread. Scientists concluded that while the hippocampus is needed in the creation of new memories, it is not needed in the retrieval of old ones; they are two separate processes. They also realized that the hippocampus and the medial temporal lobes, both of the areas removed from Molaison, are the areas responsible for converting short-term memory to long-term memory.

Much of the early work of cognitive neuropsychology was carried out with limited reference to the detailed localisation of brain pathology. Neuroimaging was relatively imprecise and other anatomically based techniques were also limited. The emphasis of many researchers as late as 1990 was on the analysis of patterns of cognitive deficit rather than on where the injury was located. Despite the lack of detailed anatomical data, studies of reading, language and memory had a number of important implications. The first is that certain cognitive processes (such as language) could be damaged separately from others, and so might be handled by distinct and independent cognitive (and neural) processes. (For more on the cognitive neuropsychological approach to language, see Eleanor Saffran, among others.) The second is that such processes might be localized to specific areas of the brain. Whilst both of these claims are still controversial to some degree, the influence led to a focus on brain injury as a potentially fruitful way of understanding the relationship between psychology and neuroscience.

== Methods ==
A key approach within cognitive neuropsychology has been to use single case studies and dissociation as a means of testing theories of cognitive function. For example, if a theory states that reading and writing are simply different skills stemming from a single cognitive process, it should not be possible to find a person who, after brain injury, can write but not read or read but not write. This selective breakdown in skills suggests that different parts of the brain are specialized for the different processes and so the cognitive systems are separable.

The philosopher Jerry Fodor has been particularly influential in cognitive neuropsychology, particularly with the idea that the mind, or at least certain parts of it, may be organised into independent modules. Evidence that cognitive skills may be damaged independently seem to support this theory to some degree, although it is clear that some aspects of mind (such as belief for example) are unlikely to be modular. Fodor, a strict functionalist, rejects the idea that the neurological properties of the brain have any bearing on its cognitive properties and doubts the whole discipline of cognitive neuropsychology.

With improved neuroimaging techniques, it has been possible to correlate patterns of impairment with a knowledge of exactly which parts of the nervous system are damaged, allowing previously undiscovered functional relationships to be explored (the lesion method). Contemporary cognitive neuropsychology uses many of the same techniques and technologies from the wider science of neuropsychology and fields such as cognitive neuroscience. These may include neuroimaging, electrophysiology and neuropsychological tests to measure either brain function or psychological performance. Useful technology in cognitive neuropsychology includes positrona-emission tomography (PET) and functional magnetic resonance imaging (fMRI). These techniques make it possible to identify the areas of the brain responsible for performing certain cognitive tasks by measuring blood flow in the brain. PET scans sense the low-level radiation in the brain and produce 3D images, whereas an fMRI works on a magnetic signal and is used to “map the brain”. Electroencephalography (EEG) records the brain’s electrical activity and can identify changes that occur over milliseconds. EEG is often used in patients with epilepsy to detect seizure activity.

The principles of cognitive neuropsychology have recently been applied to mental illness, with a view to understanding, for example, what the study of delusions may tell us about the function of normal belief. This relatively young field is known as cognitive neuropsychiatry.

== See also ==
- Capgras delusion
- CDR computerized assessment system
- Clive Wearing
- Cognitive bias
- Cognitive neuropsychiatry
- Cotard delusion
- Emotion and memory
- Erotomania
- Face perception
- Fregoli delusion
- HM (patient)
- Neuropsychological test
- Outline of brain mapping
- Outline of the human brain
- Phineas Gage
- Primary sensory cortex
- Prosopagnosia
- Retinotopy
