= Mirrored-self misidentification =

Delusional belief that one's reflection in the mirror is another person

Mirrored-self misidentification is the delusional belief that one's reflection in the mirror is another person – typically a younger or second version of one's self, a stranger, or a relative. This delusion occurs most frequently in patients with dementia and an affected patient maintains the ability to recognize others' reflections in the mirror. It is caused by right hemisphere cranial dysfunction that results from traumatic brain injury, stroke, or general neurological illness. It is an example of a monothematic delusion, a condition in which all abnormal beliefs have one common theme, as opposed to a polythematic delusion, in which a variety of unrelated delusional beliefs exist. This delusion is also classified as one of the delusional misidentification syndromes (DMS). A patient with a DMS condition consistently misidentifies places, objects, persons, or events. DMS patients are not aware of their psychological condition, are resistant to correction and their conditions are associated with brain disease – particularly right hemisphere brain damage and dysfunction.

== Prevalence ==
Delusional misidentification syndromes can occur in patients with a wide variety of cranial dysfunctions. Mirrored-self misidentification, a type of DMS, occurs most typically in patients with dementia, especially Alzheimer's disease. Approximately 2% to 10% of all patients with Alzheimer's disease have mirrored-self misidentification. Patients with schizophrenia, right frontal ischemic stroke, and rarely patients with Parkinson's disease have also reported being affected by this delusion. The exact prevalence of patients with this delusion is relatively unknown because the typical patient has many comorbidities; this makes it difficult to separate the symptoms of mirrored-self misidentification from other existing psychological conditions. Furthermore, a standard neurological or neuropsychological workup tends to overlook the existence of this delusion because affected patients have extensive cognitive degeneration that is the main focus of medical attention. As such, it can be incumbent upon the patient's family to recognize symptoms of the delusion, mainly that the patient is unable to recognize him or herself in the mirror but has an intact ability to recognize the reflections of others.

== Neurological basis ==
All patients with mirrored-self misidentification have some type of right hemisphere dysfunction. The right hemisphere, particularly frontal right hemisphere circuits, is involved in processing self-related stimuli and helps one recognize a picture or reflection of oneself. An impairment in the right hemisphere, the likely source of the "self" in the brain, can inhibit one's ability to recognize faces, especially one's own.

Patients tend to experience a distortion of the right dorsolateral prefrontal cortex, which impairs the patient's belief evaluation system. Patients can no longer logically reject delusional beliefs. Injury to the right frontal lobe is found in 35% of cases and can also inhibit one's ability to reject delusional beliefs on the basis of implausibility. Patients with this delusion also tend to have larger right anterior horns than the typical person. These cranial distortions point to right frontal atrophy and general right hemisphere dysfunction.

While approximately 50% of all patients exhibit left hemisphere damage, all patients with this hemispheric dysfunction also have cranial lesions in the right hemisphere. As no patients with solely left hemisphere damage have been reported to experience this delusion, this points to the delusion being strongly associated with right hemisphere dysfunction.

In a few select case studies, patients with this delusion have such extensive right-hemisphere cranial damage that one is also unable to identify close relatives and others with whom the patient has close association. Such extensive damage in mirrored-self misidentification patients is rare; typically patients retain the ability to recognize others’ reflections in the mirror. When such extensive neurological damage occurs, the affected patient relies on non-facial cues to identify relatives. When looking in a mirror, the patient can only use facial cues to recognize one self. Therefore, in these rare cases, despite damage to the entire facial recognition area of the brain, the patient is still able to recognize relatives but unable to recognize the self in the mirror.

== Famous studies ==
There are two famous case studies of patients with mirrored-self misidentification that have contributed to the overall understanding of this delusion.

=== Case one: patient TH ===
Patient TH was in the early stages of dementia and was affected by mirror agnosia. While TH was looking into a mirror, the researcher held an object behind TH in such a way so it was reflected in the mirror. Due to his belief that mirrors represent a separate place, TH tried to reach into the mirror to retrieve the object rather than reaching over his shoulder. TH's mirror agnosia accounts for the development of the delusional idea. Because not all patients with mirror agnosia develop the delusion, there needs to be the presence of a second factor that explains why TH does not reject his delusional belief that the object is inside the mirror. Neuropsychological testing showed TH had an impaired right hemisphere. He displayed poor visual memory and visuoconstructional problems but still had basic visuoperceptual skills, a normal intelligence, typical vocabulary, and average semantic ability. These issues are indicative of significant right hemisphere dysfunction, specifically in the right dorsolateral prefrontal cortex. Because of such cranial impairments, TH was unable to use logic to reject his delusional beliefs based on implausibility. From this case study, researchers concluded that while not all patients with mirror agnosia develop mirrored-self misidentification, when mirror agnosia is paired with right hemisphere damage of the belief evaluation system, the delusion will develop.

=== Case two: patient FE ===
Patient FE was also in early stages of dementia but experienced impaired facial processing rather than mirror agnosia. His distorted perception of his reflection in the mirror made him unable to pair the reflection to a memory of the appearance of his own face. This prompted him to believe that the person in the mirror was someone other than himself. Because not all patients with impaired facial processing develop mirrored-self misidentification, such as patients with prosopagnosia, there needed to be a second factor to explain FE's delusions. Neuropsychological testing showed that FE had extensive cranial damage in his right hemisphere. He had poor visual memory and visuoconstructional problems whilst retaining basic visuoperceptual skills. These impairments made FE unable to use logic to reject his belief that the person in the mirror was someone other than him. From this case study, researchers concluded that while not all patients with impaired facial processing develop mirrored-self misidentification, when the impairment is paired with damage to the belief evaluation system in the right dorsolateral prefrontal cortex, the delusion will develop.

== Two-factor theory of delusional belief ==
Mirrored-self misidentification is an example of a monothematic delusion – a delusion restricted to a single topic or theme. The two-factor theory of delusional belief explains why monothematic delusions occur. The two case studies outlined above helped with the development of this theory. The theory states that two separate factors are together responsible for monothematic delusions. The first factor (factor 1) explains the content of the delusion and strives to determine why the delusional idea developed. The second factor (factor 2) identifies why the delusion persists rather than being rejected based on implausibility or bizarreness.

=== Factor 1 ===
Factor 1 is responsible for identifying why the delusional idea developed. In monothematic delusions, some neuropsychological abnormality typically causes the delusion. In mirrored-self misidentification, this abnormality can be either impaired facial processing or mirror agnosia. Patients with impaired facial processing cannot pair the reflected face in the mirror to a memory of one's own face, thus leading to the conclusion that the person in the mirror must be someone other than one's self. Patients with mirror agnosia are unable to understand how mirrors work; they believe the mirror represents a separate space, typically either the other side of a window or another room due to the presence of a hole in the wall. However, not all patients with impaired facial processing or mirror agnosia develop the delusion; there therefore needs to be a second factor that accounts for why some patients with impaired facial processing or mirror agnosia develop the delusion and others with the same conditions do not.

=== Factor 2 ===
Factor 2 is responsible for identifying why the delusion is an accepted belief rather than rejected due to implausibility or bizarreness. Damage to the right hemisphere, specifically the right dorsolateral prefrontal cortex, impairs the patient's belief evaluation system. The patient loses the ability to use logic to reject the delusional belief that the mirrored reflection is another person.

Only patients who have both factor 1 (impaired facial processing or mirror agnosia) and factor 2 (cranial damage to the right hemisphere) will develop the mirrored-self misidentification delusion. Patients with impaired facial processing who do not have mirrored-self misidentification have prosopagnosia. Patients who experience right hemisphere dysfunction but do not have impaired facial processing or mirror agnosia will experience general sensory-motor and cognitive impairment.

== Self-recognition in patients without mirrored-self misidentification ==
Viewing one's own facial reflection in the mirror causes neurological changes in the right inferior frontal gyrus, the right inferior occipital gyrus, the right inferior parietal lobe, and the right parietal area. These changes, which all occur in the right hemisphere, highlight the role of the right hemisphere in self-related cognition and processing and support the theory that the right hemisphere is the most likely substrate for the "self" in the brain. When the right hemisphere is damaged in any way, the patient will most likely lose the ability to recognize one's face - the most common feature of self-recognition. When paired with mirror agnosia or impaired facial processing, damage in any of these areas of the right hemisphere of the brain can lead to difficulties in self-recognition. Delusions such as mirrored-self misidentification can then develop.

== Methods of study ==
This delusion is usually researched through conducting clinical case studies or inducing a state of hypnosis within healthy participants. When completing a case study, researchers use descriptive observational methods. Hypnosis research is typically completed in the lab as an experiment with both control and random assignment.

=== Clinical case studies ===
This delusion may be studied through observing and interviewing clinical patients in the lab. A typical case presents a patient with dementia. When in front of a mirror, the patient is asked to name the object in front of them, identify the reflection, guess the age of the person in the reflection, and describe how the self and the reflection both appear that day. The researcher then holds an object behind the patient and moves it horizontally at ear level. The researcher asks the patient to grab the object, observing if the patient reaches into the mirror or turns around to take the object from the researcher's hand. Lastly, a patient is asked to identify parts of his or her own body in the mirror. While this research method is helpful to understand typical characteristics of the delusion, it can be particularly difficult to conduct a valid study in this way due to patients’ medical comorbidities and general extensive cognitive deterioration. It is difficult to attribute particular symptoms to the mirrored-self misidentification delusion rather than to a separate feature of the patient's general dementia. As such, hypnosis of healthy patients is typically used to study the delusion because it can highlight the symptoms of the delusion while removing the influence of other comorbidities.

=== Hypnosis ===
Because of the neurological deterioration associated with this delusion, it can be difficult to separate conditions of mirrored-self misidentification with conditions of common comorbidities. Hypnosis is a commonly used method to study this delusion because it offers the opportunity to recreate particular aspects of delusions in research participants without the presence of comorbidities. Researchers can remove confusion caused by other unrelated symptoms and make specific conclusions about mirrored-self misidentification itself. Hypnosis generates false beliefs and disrupts normal cognitive evaluation without having any lasting consequences for healthy research participants. Hypnotic delusions are very similar to clinical delusions, in that both subjects exhibit delusional resistance to challenge and autobiographical memory during delusions. When their beliefs are challenged, both clinical and hypnotic patients will defend their delusional beliefs, will refuse to reject their beliefs, and will provide fabricated explanations to account for them. Because hypnosis can recreate the false beliefs (accounting for factor 1 of the two-factor theory of delusional belief above) and disrupt the ability to reject a belief on implausibility (accounting for factor 2) with no lasting consequences, it is a good model to study monothematic delusions, particularly mirrored-self misidentification.

Cognitive-delusory hypnosis is the most difficult type of hypnotic suggestion to enter and is required to study mirrored-self misidentification. Therefore, only those who are highly susceptible to hypnosis can participate in these studies. In a typical study, participants are placed in a hypnotic trance and are either told to see a stranger in the mirror or to see a face in the mirror that cannot be identified. Those who are told to see an unidentifiable face in the mirror do not necessarily see a stranger; the participant may perceive the face as an unrecognizable version of one's own. To determine the impact of hypnosis on a participant, the participant is asked to describe what one sees in the mirror. If a participant reports seeing a stranger, the experimenter tries to get the participant to let go of the delusion by proposing various questions and challenges. A researcher inquires about appearance (how is it possible the participant and the reflection wear the same clothes?), behavior (when the participant places one's finger on one's nose, how is it possible the reflection performs the same action simultaneously?), and vision (how does the participant see the experimenter both in real life and in the mirror if the mirror does not produce reflections?). Because the research participants were only prompted to exhibit symptoms of mirrored-self misidentification delusion, researchers can attribute their behavior strictly to the delusion, rather than having various comorbidities affect behavior as well. This typical study set-up also highlights the ways in which hypnosis can help study this delusion because it can generate false beliefs and remove the ability to reject the belief even when it is challenged.

== Comorbidities ==
Patients with mirrored-self misidentification may have other delusional misidentification syndromes (DMS) as comorbidities, including Capgras delusion, Fregoli delusion, Cotard delusion, reduplicative paramnesia, unilateral neglect, and thought insertion. Phantom border delusional misidentification symptom, or the belief that someone else is living in one's home, is also common among mirrored-self misidentification patients because the patient misidentifies one's mirror reflection to be another person. Comorbidities can be hard to record because the typical patient has Alzheimer's disease or other forms of dementia that make it difficult to separate various existing conditions.

== Treatment ==
There is no explicit treatment for mirrored-self misidentification. However, cognitive-behavioral therapy is typically used as a treatment for many different types of delusions. Individual therapy is best suited to treat the patient's unique delusions. Antipsychotics may be used to treat delusions; however, they have somewhat limited success.
