= Fregoli delusion =

Mental disorder

- Other names: Fregoli syndrome
- Specialty: Neuropsychiatry

Fregoli delusion or Fregoli syndrome (FS) is a rare mental disorder in which a person holds a delusional belief that different people are in fact a single person who changes appearance or is in disguise. The syndrome may be related to a brain lesion and is often of a paranoid nature, with the delusional person believing themselves persecuted by the person they believe is in disguise.

A person with the Fregoli delusion may also inaccurately recall places, objects, and events. This disorder can be explained by "associative nodes". The associative nodes serve as a biological link of information about other people with a particular familiar face (to the patient). This means that for any face that is similar to a recognizable face to the patient, the patient will recall that face as the person they know.

The Fregoli delusion is classed both as a monothematic delusion, since it only encompasses one delusional topic, and as a delusional misidentification syndrome (DMS), a class of delusional beliefs that involve misidentifying people, places, or objects.

== Signs and symptoms ==
Fregoli delusion has the following symptoms:

- Delusions
- Visual memory deficits
- Deficits in self-monitoring
- Deficits in self-awareness
- Hallucinations
- Deficits in executive functions
- Deficits in cognitive flexibility
- History of seizure activity
- Epileptogenic activity

== Causes ==
=== Levodopa treatment ===
Levodopa, also known as L-DOPA, is the precursor to several catecholamines, specifically of dopamine, epinephrine and norepinephrine. It is clinically used to treat Parkinson's disease and dopamine-responsive dystonia. Clinical studies have shown that the use of levodopa can lead to visual hallucinations and delusions. In most patients, delusions were more salient than hallucinations. With prolonged use of levodopa, the delusions occupy almost all of a patient's attention. In experimental studies, when the concentration of levodopa decreases, the number of reported delusions decreases as well. It has been concluded that delusions related to antiparkinsonian medications are one of the leading causes of Fregoli syndrome.

=== Traumatic brain injury ===
Injury to the right frontal and left temporo-parietal areas can cause Fregoli syndrome. Research by Feinberg, et al. has shown that significant deficits in executive and memory functions follow shortly after damage in the right frontal or left temporoparietal areas. Tests performed on patients that have had a brain injury revealed that basic attention ability and visuomotor processing speed are typically normal. However, these patients made many errors when they were called to participate in detailed attention tasks. Selective attention tests involving auditory targets were also performed, and brain-injured patients had many errors; this meant that they were deficient in their response regulation and inhibition.

The most profound finding in Feinberg et al.'s paper is that performance tests on the retrieval process of memory was significantly damaged in brain-injured patients. They found, however, that these patients chose incorrect answers that were related semantically (i.e., chose vegetable instead of fruit). More importantly, tests of visual memory showed that there was a severe inability in visual recollection. Overall, brain-injured patients were severely impaired in many executive functions such as self-monitoring, mental flexibility, and social reasoning.

Fregoli syndrome is an illusion of positive doubles where there is an over-familiarity with the environment. This over-familiarity may have four causes:

- Impaired self monitoring — passive acceptance of inaccurate conclusions
- Faulty filtering — tendency to select salient associations rather than a relevant one
- Mnemonic association from routine thoughts
- Perseveration — unable to come up with an alternate hypothesis

Thus, executive dysfunction appears to be necessary to identify one as having Fregoli's syndrome.

=== Fusiform gyrus ===
Current research has shown that lesions in the right temporal lobe and the fusiform gyrus may contribute to DMSs. MRIs of patients exemplifying Fregoli symptoms have shown parahippocampal and hippocampal damage in the anterior fusiform gyrus, as well as the middle and inferior of the right temporal gyri. The inferior and medial of the right temporal gyri are the storage locations for long-term memory in retrieving information on visual recognition, specifically of faces; thus, damage to these intricate connections could be one of the leading factors in face misidentification disorders.

Recently, a face-specific area in the fusiform gyrus has been discovered and is close to the anterior fusiform gyrus. MRI studies performed by Hudson, et al. have shown lesions in the anterior fusiform gyrus, which is close to the face specific area (ventral fusiform cortex), may also be associated with Fregoli syndrome and other DMSs. Such damage may cause disruption in long-term visual memory and lead to improper associations of human faces.

On another note, our brains interpret visual scenes in two pathways: one is via the parietal lobe-occipital dorsal pathway (visual spatial material is analyzed here), and the other is via the temporal-occipital ventral pathway (recognizes objects and faces). Thus, lesions in either structures or disruption of delicate connections may produce DMSs.

=== Abnormal P300 ===
Delusional misidentification syndrome is thought to occur due to a dissociation between identification and recognition processes. The integration of information for further processing is referred to as working memory (WM). The P300 (P stands for positive voltage potential and the 300 for the 300-millisecond poststimulus) is an index of WM and is used during a WM test in DMS patients. In comparison to normal patients, DMS patients generally exhibit an attenuated amplitude of P300 at many abductions. These patients also exhibit prolonged latencies of P300 at all abductions. These implications suggest that DMSs are accompanied by abnormal WM, specifically affecting the prefrontal cortex (both outside and inside).

Past studies have shown correlations between DMS and damages to the right-hemispheric function, which has an array of functions (insight, 3D shapes, art awareness, imagination, left-hand control, music awareness, etc.). In recent years, the P300 auditory component, which forms in response to a detection task that occurs a short time after a stimulus, has acquired a great deal of recognition. The P300 component is an index of mental activity in that its amplitude increases highly with increased stimuli. This P300 component is correlated with updating the working memory to what is expected in the environment. Other findings enhance the belief that defects in the working memory are associated with DMS. Papageorgio et al.'s paper, psychological evidence for altered information processing in delusional misidentification syndromes, hypothesized that electrophysiological brain activity in the working memory and P300 component can help identify the mechanisms of DMS. Thus, they concentrated on P300 released during a working memory test in DMS patients.

Papageorgio et al. also found that DMS patients had a lower P300 amplitude in the right hemisphere compared to the control group (non-DMS patients). From this result, the researchers implied that shorter P300 amplitudes are highly correlated with gray matter abnormalities; this finding is consistent with the DMS patients' characteristics and the presence of gray-matter deterioration. DMS patients were also found to have prolonged P300 lag, and their memory performance was lower than the control groups. The researchers were, thus, able to imply that DMS patients have trouble in focusing their resources to a stimulus; this was hypothesized to be caused by the neurodegeneration of the right hemisphere. Overall, other research studies have also provided evidence in the correlation of DMS and gray-matter degeneration of the right frontal region, which controls attentional resources. This research is important, because it can help determine the mechanisms of DMS, which can then help conjure a more effective target drug and/or treatment plan for those with DMS.

== Treatment ==
Once it has been positively identified, pharmacotherapy follows. Antipsychotic drugs are the frontrunners in treatment for Fregoli and other DMSs. In addition to antipsychotics, anticonvulsants and antidepressants are also prescribed in some treatment courses.

== History ==
The condition is named after the Italian actor Leopoldo Fregoli, who was renowned for his ability to make quick changes of appearance during his stage act.

P. Courbon and G. Fail first reported the condition in a 1927 paper (Syndrome d'illusion de Frégoli et schizophrénie). They described a 27-year-old woman living in London who believed she was being persecuted by two actors she often saw at the theatre. She believed these people pursued her closely, taking the form of people she knew or met.

=== Delusional misidentification syndromes and Fregoli ===
Delusional misidentification syndromes (DMS) are rooted in the inability to register the identity of something, whether it is an object, event, place or even a person. There are various forms of DMS, such as the syndrome of subjective doubles, intermetamorphosis, Capgras syndrome and Fregoli syndrome. However, all of these various syndromes have a common denominator: they are all due to malfunctional familiarity processing during information processing. The most common syndromes are Capgras and Fregoli. Capgras syndrome is the delusional belief that a friend, family member, etc., has been replaced by a twin impostor. Fregoli syndrome is the delusional belief that different people are in fact a single person who is in disguise. Other commonalities among these syndromes are that they are discriminatory in which object(s) are misidentified. Lastly, dopamine hyperactivity is evident in all DMSs and thus, all syndromes utilize antipsychotic medications to help control DMS.

==== Coexistence of Capgras and Fregoli ====
Delusional misidentification syndromes (DMSs) are four types of syndromes: the syndrome of subjective doubles, the syndrome of intermetamorphosis, Fregoli delusion and Capgras syndrome. Of the four, Fregoli syndrome is the least frequent, followed by Capgras. Of more rarity is the coexistence of both Fregoli and Capgras syndromes. Coexistence of DMSs are enhanced when coupled with other mental disorders such as schizophrenia, bipolar disorder and other mood disorders. Depersonalization and derealization symptoms are usually manifested in patients exhibiting two misidentification delusions. However, such symptoms have been witnessed to cease once the coexisting DMSs are fully developed.

==== Fregoli syndrome for environment ====
Some patients can experience Fregoli delusion for environment or place; in this instance the patient misidentifies their current and unfamiliar location (e.g. a hospital) for a place that is familiar to them, such as their home or job. A patient can simultaneously suffer from Fregoli delusion for both persons and environments. In some cases, the patient holds the belief that they exist in both the correct and an incorrect location, a delusion that has been termed reduplicative paramnesia; the latter being a variant of the delusional misidentification syndromes.

== In popular culture ==
Charlie Kaufman's 2015 film Anomalisa has several direct and indirect references to the Fregoli delusion. Kaufman adapted the screenplay from his 2005 audio play Anomalisa, written under the pseudonym Francis Fregoli, and the hotel that Michael stays in is called "The Fregoli".

The science fiction short story "Liking What You See: A Documentary", from the collection Stories of Your Life and Others by Ted Chiang, refers to Fregoli syndrome in the context of artificial targeted neurological impairment.

In March 2020, the delusion was covered in an episode of the BBC medical soap opera Doctors when Lizzie Milton (Adele James) believes she is being stalked by Joe Pasquale.

There is an oblique reference to the delusion in "Marco Polo," an episode of The Sopranos. The character Russ Fegoli (R Fegoli being an anagram of Fregoli) is implied to be the father of Paulie "Walnuts" Gualtieri.

In Alex Garland’s 2022 folk horror film Men, the protagonist perceives the entire male population of a Herefordshire village (all played by Rory Kinnear) to share the same face.

In the 2024 movie Smile 2, a character named Lewis Fregoli is cursed by an entity. In the previous film, Smile, another character describes the entity as "wearing people's faces like masks."

In the 2025 Tamil film Madharaasi, the hero Raghu (Sivakarthikeyan) is shown to suffer from the disorder after witnessing an accident which killed his parents.

== See also ==
- Agnosia – Inability to process sensory information
- Capgras delusion – The delusional belief that the sufferer's close friends and/or loved ones have been replaced by identical impostors
- Cotard delusion – The delusional belief that the sufferer is dead
- Delusional disorder – Mental disorder featuring beliefs with inadequate grounding
- Erotomania – Romantic delusional disorder
- Mirrored-self misidentification – Delusional belief that one's reflection in the mirror is another person
- Paramnesia
- Prosopagnosia – Cognitive disorder of face perception
- Psychosis – Abnormal condition of the mind
- Schizophrenia – Mental disorder with psychotic symptoms
