= Clinical lycanthropy =

Delusion of being a non-human animal

- Other names: Clinical zoanthropy
- Specialty: Psychiatry, Clinical Psychology

Clinical lycanthropy is a rare psychiatric syndrome that involves a delusion that the affected person can transform into, has transformed into, or is a non-human animal. Its name is associated with the mythical condition of lycanthropy, a supernatural affliction in which humans are said to physically shapeshift into wolves. Although lycanthropy is defined as transforming into a wolf, current-day researchers often use the term to refer to a broad range of transformations into animals. In earlier years, transforming into animals other than wolves was commonly described as zoanthropy.

== Signs and symptoms ==
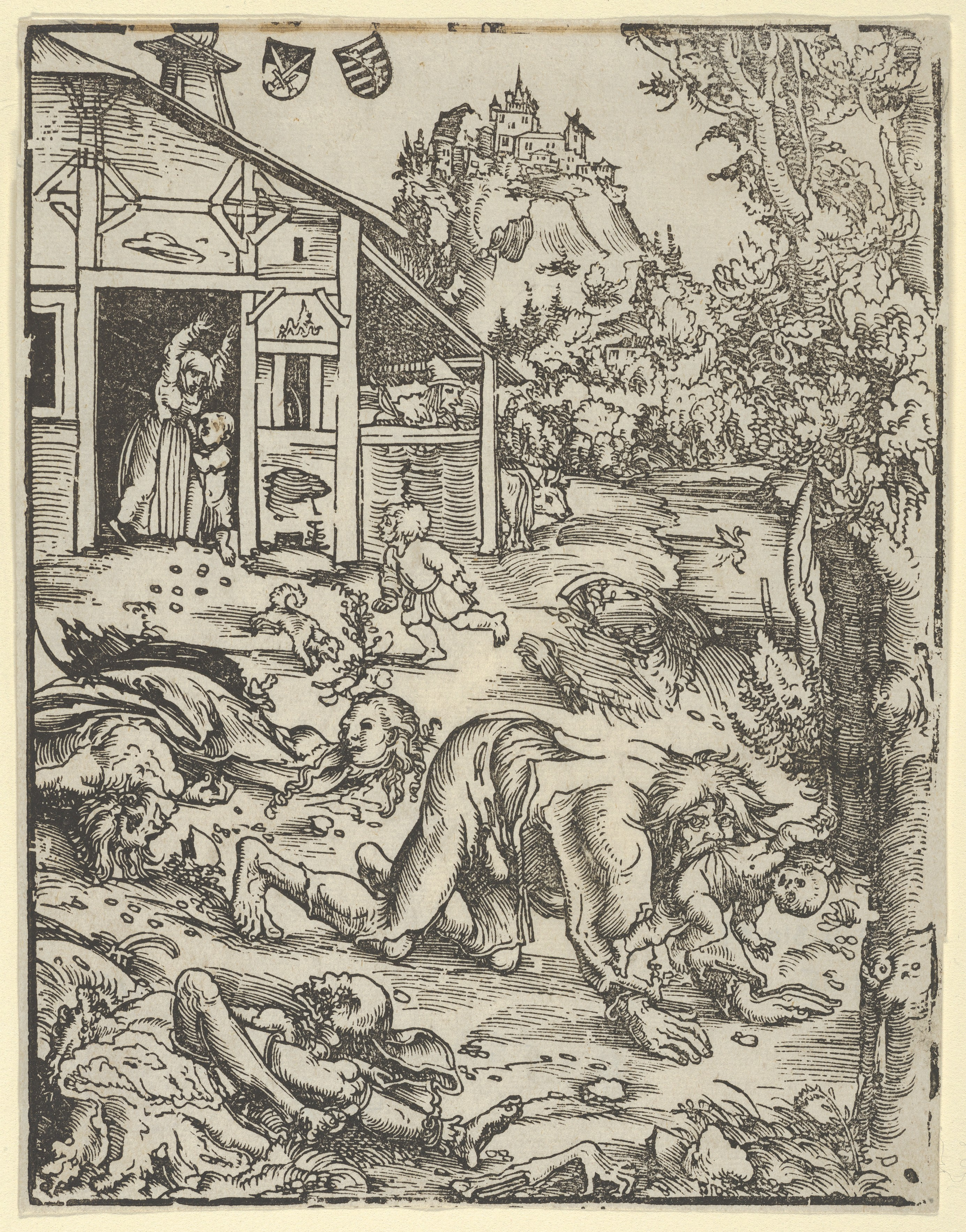
The attacks of a man who imagined himself to be a wolf. Lucas Cranach the Elder. Woodcut. Circa 1512.

Affected individuals believe that they are in the process of transforming into an animal, or have already transformed into an animal. Clinical lycanthropy has been associated with the altered states of mind that accompany psychosis, the mental state that typically involves delusions and hallucinations, with the transformation only seeming to happen in the mind and behavior of the affected person.

A 28-year-old murderer who suffered from lycanthropy described his mental disorder in the following way:

When I'm emotionally upset, I feel as if I am turning into something else; my fingers go numb, as if I had pins and needles right in the middle of my hand; I can no longer control myself… I get the feeling I'm becoming a wolf. I look at myself in the mirror and I witness my transformation. It's no longer my face; it changes completely. I stare, my pupils dilate, and I feel as if hairs are growing all over my body, as if my teeth are getting longer… I feel as if my skin is no longer mine.

A 1988 study on clinical lycanthropy from the McLean Hospital reported on a series of cases and proposed some diagnostic criteria by which clinical lycanthropy could be recognised:

- A patient reports in a moment of lucidity or reminiscence that they sometimes feel like an animal or have felt like one.
- A patient behaves in a manner that resembles animal behavior, for example, howling, growling, or crawling.

According to these criteria, either a delusional belief in current or past transformation or behavior that suggests a person thinks of themselves as transformed is considered evidence of clinical lycanthropy. The authors note that, although the condition seems to be an expression of psychosis, there is no specific psychiatric or neurological diagnostic entity associated with its behavioral consequences.

Clinical lycanthropy is not specific to an experience of human-to-wolf transformation. A wide variety of creatures have been reported as part of the shape-shifting experience. A 2004 review of the medical literature lists over thirty published cases of clinical lycanthropy, only the minority of which have wolf (lycanthropy) or dog (cynanthropy) themes. Canines are certainly not uncommon, although the experience of being transformed into other animals such as a hyena, cat, horse, bird, or tiger has been reported on more than one occasion.

Transformation into frogs, and even bees, has been reported in some instances. The term ophidianthropy refers to the delusion that one has been transformed into a snake, of which two case studies have been reported.

In Japan, transformation into foxes and dogs was common (Kitsunetsuki, ja:犬神). A 1989 case study described how one individual reported a serial transformation, experiencing a change from human to dog, to a horse, and then to a cat, before returning to the reality of human existence after treatment. There are also reports of people who experienced transformation into an animal, only listed as "unspecified".

== Proposed mechanisms ==
Clinical lycanthropy is a very rare condition and is largely considered to be an idiosyncratic expression of a psychotic or dissociative episode caused by another condition such as dissociative identity disorder, schizophrenia, bipolar disorder, or clinical depression. It has also been associated with drug intoxication and withdrawal, cerebrovascular disease, traumatic brain injury, dementia, delirium, and seizures.

However, there are suggestions that certain neurological conditions and cultural influences may result in the expression of the human-animal transformation theme that defines the condition.

=== Neurological factors ===
One important factor may be differences or changes in parts of the brain known to be involved in representing body shape (e.g., see proprioception and body image). A neuroimaging study of two people diagnosed with clinical lycanthropy showed that these areas display unusual activation, suggesting that when people report their bodies are changing shape, they may be genuinely perceiving those feelings.

=== Treatment ===
Because clinical lycanthropy is strongly associated with psychotic disorders, antipsychotic medication is often an effective treatment. It may also be treated with antidepressants or mood stabilizers, in cases in which it is a symptom of depression or bipolar disorder. Patients with clinical lycanthropy may also benefit from a cultural approach to treatment, as the syndrome is generally agreed to be culture-bound.

== Related disorders ==
Clinical lycanthropy is a type of delusional misidentification syndrome of the self, and it often overlaps with other delusional misidentification syndromes. For example, there is a case study of a psychiatric patient who had both clinical lycanthropy and Cotard's syndrome.

In rare cases, individuals may believe that other people have transformed into animals. This has been termed "lycanthropic intermetamorphosis" and "lycanthropy spectrum." A 2009 study reported that, after the consumption of the drug MDMA (Ecstasy), a man displayed symptoms of paranoid psychosis by claiming that his relatives had changed into various animals such as a boar, a donkey, and a horse.

== History ==
Catherine Clark Kroeger has written that several parts of the Bible refer to King Nebuchadnezzar's behavior in Daniel 4 as being a manifestation of clinical lycanthropy. Neurologist Andrew J. Larner has written that the fate of Odysseus's crew due to the magic of Circe may be one of the earliest examples of clinical lycanthropy.

According to Persian tradition, the Buyid prince Majd al-Dawla (993–1029) was experiencing an illusion that he was a cow. He was cured by Ibn Sina.

Abraham ibn Ezra (c. 1089 – c. 1167) in his commentary on Daniel 4 relates that on the island of Sardinia, a man became insane, ran away and spent many years among the deer, walking on all fours. Once, the king of the island went hunting and caught many deer and this man was caught along with them. His parents came and recognized him. They spoke to him and he didn't answer. They placed before him bread to eat and wine to drink and he refused. Then they gave him grass and he ate. At midnight he ran away back to "the wild does".

Notions that lycanthropy was due to a medical condition go back to the fourth century, when the Alexandrian physician Oribasius attributed lycanthropy to melancholia or an "excess of black bile". In 1563, a Lutheran physician named Johann Weyer wrote that werewolves had an imbalance in their melancholic humour and exhibited the physical symptoms of paleness, "a dry tongue and a great thirst" as well as sunken, dim and dry eyes.

Even King James VI and I in his 1597 treatise Daemonologie does not blame werewolf behaviour on delusions created by the Devil but "an excess of melancholy as the culprit which causes some men to believe that they are wolves and to 'counterfeit' the actions of these animals". The perception of an association between mental illness and animalistic behaviour can be traced throughout the history of folklore from many different countries.

== Case examples ==
On August 15, 2016, Martin County Florida Sheriff's Office deputies found a 19-year-old male on top of a bloodied 59-year-old man, gnawing on his face, eating pieces of flesh, and making growling sounds. Officers tased, repeatedly kicked, and ultimately required a police dog's assistance in subduing the 19-year-old. Inside the garage of the home on Southeast Kokomo Lane, just north of the Palm Beach County line, deputies found a 53-year-old woman, beaten, bloodied and unresponsive. Ultimately both the 59-year-old man and 53-year-old woman would die from their injuries. In the weeks ahead of this incident, the 19-year-old told family members he believed he was either half-man, half-horse or half-man, half-dog. Clinical psychologist Dr. Phillip Resnick later assessed the 19-year-old as having clinical lycanthropy.

According to a case report referenced in the January 2014 issue of the Journal of Neuropsychiatry and Clinical Neurosciences, a 20-year-old man was admitted to a mental hospital due to his increasingly agitated and erratic behaviors. During his initial evaluation, he was guarded and preoccupied. He had no previous psychiatric history. Over the next few days, he displayed increasingly psychotic, animal-like behaviors, including howling loudly, running abruptly, and crawling on all fours. He appeared to be internally stimulated. When asked about these behaviors, he was initially evasive but eventually admitted that he believed he was a werewolf and would periodically transform into a wolf. These beliefs started after the patient reported having visions of "the Devil" years before, as well as hearing random voices. The patient was started on ziprasidone and his symptoms gradually responded, with his animal-like behaviors eventually ceasing altogether.

A 25-year-old man was sent for treatment during a period of excessive hand-washing, irritable behavior, decreased sleep, and acting like a buffalo. The patient reported that he had engaged in sexual activity with his buffalo and believed that buffalo cells had entered his body and were transforming him into a buffalo. He began obsessively washing his hands and genitals in order to avoid the transition. He saw himself as having buffalo body parts and became preoccupied about his appearance. He then began to act as a buffalo by nodding his head, crawling on all fours, and seeking out hay and grass to eat. He was ultimately diagnosed with obsessive-compulsive disorder and body dysmorphic disorder with delusional beliefs. He was treated with fluoxetine and risperidone, and after 6 months of pharmacotherapy, his body dysmorphia and hand-washing were both reduced.

== See also ==
- Clinical vampirism – Obsession with drinking blood
- Man into Wolf – Book by Robert Eisler
- Wendigo – Mythical being in Native American folklore
