= Monothematic (disambiguation) =

Monothematic may refer to:

- Music with a single subject
- Monothematic name, given name based on a single lexeme
- Monothematic delusion, delusional state that concerns only one particular topic
