= Delusional misidentification syndrome =

Psychological disorder

- Specialty: Psychiatry

Delusional misidentification syndrome is an umbrella term, introduced by George N. Christodoulou (in his book The Delusional Misidentification Syndromes, Karger, Basel, 1986) for a group of four delusional disorders that occur in the context of mental and neurological illness. They are grouped together as they often occur simultaneously or interchangeably, and they display the common concept of the double (sosie). They all involve a belief that the identity of a person, object, or place has somehow changed or has been altered. Christodoulou further categorized these disorders into those including hypo (or under)-identification of a well-known person (Capgras delusion), and hyper (or over)-identification of an unknown person (the remaining three). As these delusions typically only concern one particular topic, they also fall under the category called monothematic delusions.

== Variants ==
This psychopathological syndrome is usually considered to include four main variants:

- Capgras delusion is the belief that (usually) a close relative or spouse has been replaced by an identical-looking impostor.
- Fregoli delusion is the belief that various people the believer meets are actually the same person wearing various disguises.
- Intermetamorphosis is the belief that an individual has the ability to take the form of another person in both external appearance and internal personality.
- Syndrome of subjective doubles is the belief that one has a doppelgänger or double of themselves carrying out independent actions. It was described by Christodoulou in 1978 in the American Journal of Psychiatry.

However, similar delusional beliefs, often singularly or more rarely reported, are sometimes also considered to be part of the delusional misidentification syndrome. For example:

- Mirrored-self misidentification is the belief that one's reflection in a mirror is some other person.
- Reduplicative paramnesia is the belief that a familiar person, place, object, or body part has been duplicated. For example, a person may believe that they are in fact not in the hospital to which they were admitted, but an identical-looking hospital in a different part of the country.
- Cotard's syndrome is the belief that one is dead (either figuratively or literally), does not exist, is putrefying, or have lost their blood or internal organs. In rare instances, it can include delusions of immortality.
- Delusional companion syndrome is the belief that objects (such as soft toys or mannequins) are sentient, living beings.
- Clonal pluralization of the self is the belief that there are multiple copies of oneself, identical both physically and psychologically, but physically separate and distinct.
- Clinical lycanthropy is the belief that one is turning or has turned into an animal or supernatural creature. It is considered a delusional misidentification of the self.

There is considerable evidence that conditions such as Capgras delusion and Fregoli delusion are associated with disorders of face perception and recognition. However, it has been suggested that all misidentification problems exist on a continuum of anomalies of familiarity, from déjà vu at one end to the formation of delusional beliefs at the other.

== See also ==
- Cognitive neuropsychiatry – Multidisciplinary field
- Crisis actor conspiracy theory
- Implicit memory – Type of long-term human memory
- Prosopagnosia – Cognitive disorder of face perception
- Truman Show delusion – Delusion in which one believes their life is a staged reality TV show
