= Lissauer =

Lissauer is a German surname. Notable people with the surname include:

- Abraham Lissauer (1832–1908), Polish-German physician and archaeologist
- Ernst Lissauer (1882–1937), German poet and dramatist
- Heinrich Lissauer (1861–1891), Prussian-German neurologist
- Jack J. Lissauer (born 1957), American research scientist
- Robert Lissauer (1917–2004), American composer, author, and musicologist
- Trevor Lissauer (born 1973), American actor and musician
- Walter Lissauer (1882–1965), German-American member of the Early Birds of Aviation
- Woody Lissauer (born 1959), musician and producer best known for his work with the band Cubic Feet
