= Angor =

Angor may refer to:

- Angor animi, a medical symptom
- Angor, a Senagi Papuan language
- Champions of Angor, a superhero team from the DC Comics
- Angor, Uzbekistan, a town in Uzbekistan
- Angor, the nickname of Tom Clark of The Yogscast
