= Paramnesia =

Paramnesia is memory-based delusion or confabulation, or an inability to distinguish between real and fantasy memories.

It may refer more specifically to:

- Déjà vu, the phenomena where one believes that a current event has already been experienced.
- Reduplicative paramnesia, the delusion that a location exists in more than one place simultaneously.
