= Cognitive neuropsychiatry =

Multidisciplinary field

Cognitive neuropsychiatry is a growing multidisciplinary field arising out of cognitive psychology and neuropsychiatry that aims to understand mental illness and psychopathology in terms of models of normal psychological function. A concern with the neural substrates of impaired cognitive mechanisms links cognitive neuropsychiatry to the basic neuroscience. Alternatively, CNP provides a way of uncovering normal psychological processes by studying the effects of their change or impairment.

The term "cognitive neuropsychiatry" was coined by Prof Hadyn Ellis (Cardiff University ) in a paper "The cognitive neuropsychiatric origins of the Capgras delusion", presented at the International Symposium on the Neuropsychology of Schizophrenia, Institute of Psychiatry, London (Coltheart, 2007).

Although clinically useful, current syndrome classifications (e.g. DSM-IV; ICD-10) have no empirical basis as models of normal cognitive processes. CNP moves beyond diagnosis and classification to offer a cognitive explanation for established psychiatric behaviours, regardless of whether the symptoms are due to recognised brain pathology or to dysfunction in brain areas or networks without structural lesions.

CNP has been influential, not least because of its early success in explaining some psychiatric delusions, most notably the Capgras delusion, Fregoli delusion and other delusional misidentification syndromes. The Capgras delusion is "explained as the interruption in the covert route to face recognition, namely affective responses to familiar stimuli, localized in the dorsal route of vision from striate cortex to limbic system. According to standard molecular hypotheses, acute delusions are the result of a dysregulated activity of some neuromodulators."

Additionally, the study of cognitive neuropsychiatry has shown to intersect with the study of philosophy. This intersection revolves around a reconsideration of the mind-body relationship and the contemplation of moral issues that can arise by fields such as neuropsychopathology. For example, it has been under consideration whether or not Parkinson's patients should be held morally accountable for their physical actions. This discussion and study has taken place due to the discovery that under certain circumstances, Parkinson's patients can initiate and control their own movement. Examples such as this are cause for difficult judgement calls, i.e. "about who is mad and who is bad" (Stein 1999). Cognitive neuropsychiatry has also explored the difference between implicit and explicit cognition, especially in catatonic patients. For more information on the bridge between neuropsychiatry and philosophy see (e.g., Stein, Dan (1999). Philosophy, Psychiatry, & Psychology).

== See also ==
- Capgras delusion
- CDR computerized assessment system
- Cognitive neuropsychology
- Fregoli delusion
- Neuropsychiatry
