= Jules Cotard =

French physician

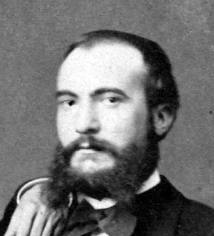
- Born: 1 June 1840; Issoudun, Indre, France
- Died: 19 August 1889 (aged 49); Vanves, Seine-et-Oise, France
- Known for: Cotard's syndrome
- Scientific career
- Fields: Neurology and psychiatry
- Workplaces: Hospice de la Salpêtrière

Jules Cotard (1 June 1840 – 19 August 1889) was a French neurologist and psychiatrist, best known for first describing the case of a patient with what would later be known as Cotard's syndrome. Cotard's syndrome consists of the delusional belief that they are dead, do not exist, or do not have bodily organs.

== Biography ==
=== Education ===
He studied medicine in Paris and later went on to work as an intern at Hospice de la Salpêtrière, where he worked for, among others, Jean-Martin Charcot.

=== Career ===
Cotard became particularly interested in cerebrovascular accidents (commonly known as 'strokes') and their consequences and undertook autopsies to better understand how these affected the brain. In 1869, Cotard left Salpêtrière, and at the outbreak of the Franco-Prussian War, he joined an infantry regiment as a regimental surgeon. Cotard moved to the town of Vanves in 1874, where he remained for the last 15 years of his life. He made particular contributions to the understanding of diabetes and delusions. In August 1889, Cotard's daughter contracted diphtheria, and he reportedly refused to leave her bedside for 15 days until she recovered. He eventually contracted diphtheria himself and died on the 19th of August.

== In popular culture ==
Jules Cotard served as the real-life model for the character of Dr. Cottard in the Marcel Proust novel In Search of Lost Time.

In the film Synecdoche, New York, protagonist Caden Cotard is a reference to the Cotard delusion.

== External links and references ==
- Works by or about Jules Cotard at the Internet Archive
- Bourgeois, M (December 1980). "[Jules Cotard and his syndrome a 100 years later]". Annales médico-psychologiques. 138 (10). FRANCE: 1165–80. ISSN 0003-4487. PMID 7013604.
- Förstl, H; Beats B (March 1992). "Charles Bonnet's description of Cotard's delusion and reduplicative paramnesia in an elderly patient (1788)" (PDF). British Journal of Psychiatry. 160 (3). ENGLAND: 416–8. doi:10.1192/bjp.160.3.416. ISSN 0007-1250. PMID 1562875.
- Pearn, J; Gardner-Thorpe C (May 2002). "Jules Cotard (1840-1889): his life and the unique syndrome which bears his name". Neurology. 58 (9). United States: 1400–3. doi:10.1212/wnl.58.9.1400. ISSN 0028-3878. PMID 12011289.
- Pearn, John; Gardner-Thorpe Christopher (May 2003). "A biographical note on Marcel Proust's Professor Cottard". Journal of Medical Biography. 11 (2). England: 103–6. doi:10.1177/096777200301100212. ISSN 0967-7720. PMID 12717539. S2CID 38635220.
- Nagy, Agnes; Vörös Viktor; Tényi Tamás (October 2008). "[About the Cotard's syndrome]". Neuropsychopharmacologia Hungarica. 10 (4). Hungary: 213–24. ISSN 1419-8711. PMID 19213200.
- Berrios, GE; Luque, R (1995). "Cotard's Delusion or Syndrome?: A Conceptual History". Comprehensive Psychiatry. 36 (3): 218–23. doi:10.1016/0010-440x(95)90085-a. PMID 7648846.
