= Hadyn Ellis =

Welsh psychologist

Professor Hadyn Ellis CBE
- Born: Hadyn Douglas Ellis; 25 October 1945; Newport, Wales
- Died: 2 November 2006 (aged 61); Cardiff, Wales
- Citizenship: United Kingdom
- Known for: Face perception, Capgras delusion
- Scientific career
- Fields: Psychology
- Workplaces: Cardiff University, University of Aberdeen

Hadyn Douglas Ellis (25 October 1945 – 2 November 2006) was a Welsh psychologist who was influential in the field of face processing and who had some 160 publications to his name.

For the largest part of his career he worked at Cardiff University, where he became pro-vice chancellor for research in 1994. He also made significant contributions to research strategy at the ESRC.

His research into face perception had significant contribution to eyewitness testimony and also the understanding of delusions of misidentification such as Capgras delusion. Ellis is also considered to be the person who coined the term cognitive neuropsychiatry.

During his career he also wrote many books, including Validation in Psychology: Research Perspectives and Perceiving and Remembering Faces.

After his death from bowel cancer, Cardiff University recognised his contribution to science and the university by naming a building in his honor. Additionally, the Hadyn Ellis Prize is awarded annually to research students at Cardiff University for the best PhD dissertation, previous winners of which have been Joseph Sweetman and Georgie Powell.
