= William Hirstein =

American philosopher

William Hirstein (born 1966) is an American philosopher primarily interested in philosophy of mind, philosophy of language, metaphysics, cognitive science, and analytic philosophy.

== Training ==
William Hirstein received his Ph.D. in philosophy at the University of California, Davis under the direction of Richard Wollheim. He then did post-doctoral work under the supervision of Patricia Churchland and Vilayanur S. Ramachandran at the University of California, San Diego, exploring neurological syndromes that lead to confabulation, such as in split-brain patients, and patients with anosognosia or Capgras delusion.

== Theory of confabulation ==
Hirstein draws heavily on the interaction between his philosophical training and his clinical experience in his 2005 book Brain Fiction to develop a comprehensive epistemic theory of the neural basis of confabulation, and argues that prefrontal executive processes fail to correct false memories or perceptions, resulting in a confabulation. Thus confabulation is a result of two errors, which may be caused by two separate brain lesions. First there is an error in memory or perception, and second, prefrontal executive processes fail to correct the error.

== Mindmelding ==
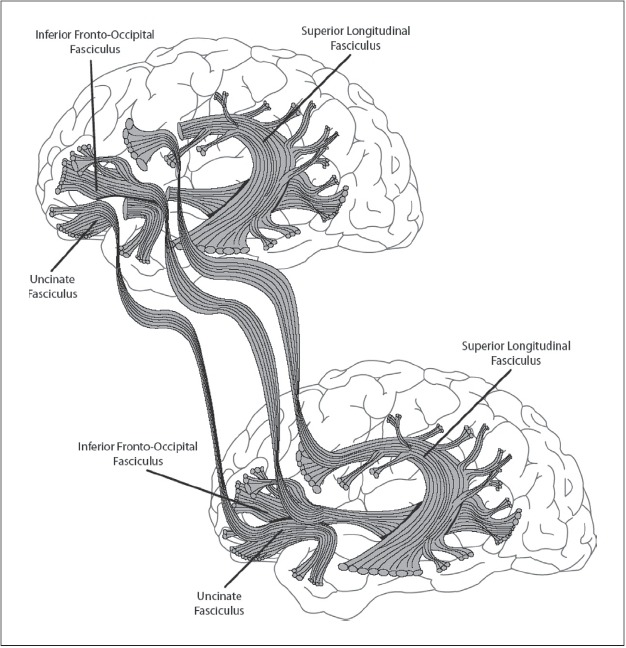
Mindmelding hypothesis.

In his 2012 book, Mindmelding: Consciousness, Neuroscience, and the Mind's Privacy, Hirstein argues that a significant block to solving the mind–body problem can be removed if we allow that it is possible for one person to directly experience the conscious mind of another. The vast majority of philosophers and scientists writing about consciousness believe that this is impossible, but this would mean that conscious brain states are different from all other physical states, which can be known about by multiple persons. This creates a block to understanding our minds as physical systems. Hirstein describes how "mindmelding" could be achieved by connecting person A's prefrontal lobes to person B's posterior cortex, which would in effect connect person A's sense of self to person B's conscious thoughts and sensations.

An example of individuals who have what may be a naturally occurring mindmeld are Krista and Tatiana Hogan, who have a unique thalamic connection may provide insight into the philosophical and neurological foundations of consciousness. It has been argued that there's no empirical test that can conclusively establish that for some sensations, the twins share one token experience rather than two exactly matching token experiences. Yet background considerations about the way the brain has specific locations for conscious contents, combined with the evident overlapping pathways in the twins' brains, arguably implies that the twins share some conscious experiences. If this is true, then the twins may offer a proof of concept for how experiences in general could be shared between brains.

== Books ==
- On Searle, Wadsworth Philosophers Series, Belmont, California: Wadsworth/Thompson Learning, 2001, ISBN 9780534576264
- On The Churchlands, Wadsworth Philosophers Series, Belmont, California: Thomson/Wadsworth, 2004, ISBN 9780534576271
- Brain Fiction: Self-deception and the riddle of confabulation, Cambridge, Massachusetts: MIT Press, 2005, ISBN 0-262-08338-8
- Cognitive Science: An Introduction to Mind and Brain, New York & London: Routledge, 2006, ISBN 9780415221016(with Daniel Kolak, Peter Mandik, and Jonathan Waskan)
- (Editor) (2009), Confabulation: Views from Neuroscience, Psychiatry, Psychology, and Philosophy, Oxford, UK & New York: Oxford University Press, ISBN 978-0-19-920891-3
- Mindmelding: Consciousness, Neuroscience, and the Mind's Privacy, Oxford: Oxford University Press, 2012, ISBN 9780199231904
- Responsible Brains: Neuroscience, Law, and Human Culpability, Cambridge, Mass.: MIT Press, 2018, ISBN 9780262038782(with Katrina L. Sifferd and Tyler K. Fagan)

== See also ==
- American philosophy
- List of American philosophers
