= Boanthropy =

Psychological disorder

Boanthropy is a psychological disorder in which a human believes themselves to be a bovine.

== Biblical account ==
King Nebuchadnezzar II of the Neo-Babylonian Empire is sometimes attributed with boanthropy based on the description in the Book of Daniel which says that he "was driven from men, and did eat grass as oxen". Carl Jung would subsequently describe 'Nebuchadnezzar...[as] a complete regressive degeneration of a man who has overreached himself'.

== Historical accounts ==
According to Persian traditions, the Buyid prince Majd al-Dawla had a delusion that he was a cow, made the sound of a cow and asked to be killed so that his flesh could be consumed. He was cured by Avicenna.

== Psychological explanations ==
Psychologists generally group boanthropy, along with other forms of zoanthropy, into the diagnosis of clinical lycanthropy. Other conditions frequently, but not universally, found in patients include schizophrenia, psychotic depression, and bipolar disorder.

It has been suggested that hypnosis, suggestion and auto-suggestion may contribute to such beliefs.

=== Psychoanalytical explanations ===
Dreams may also play an important part. Jung for example, records how a stubborn woman 'dreamed she was attending an important social occasion. She was greeted by the hostess with the words, "How nice that you could come. All your friends are here, and they are waiting for you." The hostess then led her to the door and opened it, and the dreamer stepped through—into a cowshed!'.

Freud had long since noted 'cases in which a mental disease has started with a dream and in which a delusion originating in the dream has persisted'.

R. D. Laing offers an autobiographical account of a brief reactive psychosis in which the protagonist had a 'real feeling of regression in time...I actually seemed to be wandering in a kind of landscape with—um—desert landscape—as if I were an animal, rather – rather a large animal..a kind of rhinoceros or something like that and emitting sounds like a rhinoceros'.

=== Totemism ===
Eric Berne considered the first years of life as a time when the child 'is dealing with magical people who can perhaps on occasion turn themselves into animals,' and thought that even in later life 'a great many people have an animal...which recurs again and again in their dreams. This is their totem – something which may offer a route back for early regressive identifications.

Derogatory cultural identifications of people 'like cattle, with their eyes always looking down, and their heads stooping to the earth, that is, to the dining table...they kick and butt at each other with horns and hoofs that are made of iron' go back at least as far as Plato; while the 'direct identification of woman and cow' in folk humor offers another potential source for delusional identification. Anthropological evidence such as 'a Burmese buffalo dance in which masked dancers are possessed by the buffalo spirit' would seem to confirm such totemic/cultural influences.

== Physiological explanations ==
Medical explanations suggested for apparent boanthropy include porphyria and general paresis caused by late-stage syphilis.

== In popular culture ==
- In The Cow, an Iranian movie by Dariush Mehrjui the protagonist, Masht Hassan, lives in a cowshed and eats hay after being led to believe that his beloved dairy cow has run away. In his delusion, he speaks on the cow's behalf, claiming under the guise of the cow that her master (Hassan himself) is still watching over her from outside the cowshed.
- In an episode of the anime Revolutionary Girl Utena, the young girl Nanami behaves like and eventually transforms into a cow after receiving a (presumably enchanted) cowbell as a gift and falsely believing it to be luxury jewelry. The themes of the episode are primarily feminist, using a rendition of the famous song Dona, Dona in the context of Nanami's being a cow to narrate the poor social treatment of women. Her transformation could also be interpreted as a symbol for her self-objectification due to her idolization of her appearance and willing submission to her brother's exploitation. In the movie spin-off of the anime, Nanami appears strictly in bovine form while other characters appear in the expected human form.

== See also ==
- Clinical lycanthropy (or zoanthropy)
- Hathor
- Io
- Shapeshifting
