= Sense of impending doom =

Medical symptom

- Specialty: Critical care medicine, emergency medicine, family medicine, psychiatry
- Symptoms: Sensation of imminent, life-threatening danger or tragedy
- Causes: Pheochromocytoma, blood transfusion, heart attack, panic attack, anaphylaxis, adenosine administration, certain psychoactive substances
- Risk factors: Anxiety disorders (generalized anxiety disorder, panic disorder), major depressive disorder, bipolar disorder

A sense of impending doom is a medical symptom that consists of an intense feeling that something life-threatening or tragic is about to occur, despite no apparent danger. Causes can be either psychological or physiological. Psychological causes can include an anxiety disorder (e.g., panic disorder), depression, or bipolar disorder. A sense of impending doom often precedes or accompanies a panic attack. Physiological causes could include a pheochromocytoma, heart attack, blood transfusion, anaphylaxis, or use of some psychoactive substances. The feeling can also be a transient side effect of adenosine administration, likely due to its activation of adenosine receptors. Due to adenosine's extremely short half-life, this effect is typically short-lived. A sense of impending doom can also present itself as a postoperative complication encountered after surgery.

== See also ==
- Angor animi
- Malaise
- Panic
