= Autoscopy =

Observance from outside the self

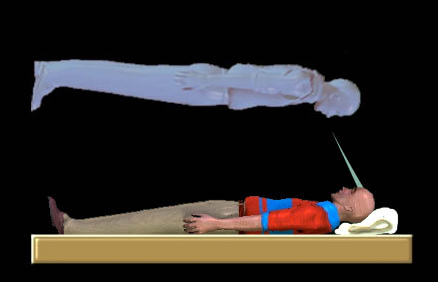

Autoscopy is the experience in which one perceives one’s surrounding environment from a different perspective, from a position outside of one’s own body. Autoscopy comes from the ancient Greek autós (αὐτός, "self") and skopós (σκοπός, "watcher").

Autoscopy has been of interest to humanity from time immemorial and is abundant in the folklore, mythology, and spiritual narratives of most ancient and modern societies. Cases of autoscopy are commonly encountered in modern psychiatric practice. According to neurological research, autoscopic experiences are hallucinations. Their root cause is unclear. Autoscopic experiences can include non-mirroring real-time images and the experiencer may be able to move.

== Factors ==
The autoscopic phenomenon is classified in the following six typologies: autoscopic hallucination, he-autoscopy or heautoscopic proper, feeling of a presence, out of body experience, negative and inner forms of autoscopy.

Laboratory of Cognitive Neuroscience, École Polytechnique Fédérale de Lausanne, Lausanne, and Department of Neurology, University Hospital, Geneva, Switzerland, have reviewed some of the classical precipitating factors of autoscopy. These are sleep, drug use, and general anesthesia as well as neurobiology. They have compared them with recent findings on neurological and neurocognitive mechanisms of autoscopy; the reviewed data suggest that autoscopic experiences are due to functional disintegration of lower-level multisensory processing and abnormal higher-level self-processing at the temporoparietal junction.

== Related disorders ==
Heautoscopy is a term used in psychiatry and neurology for the reduplicative hallucination of "seeing one's own body at a distance". It can occur as a symptom in schizophrenia and epilepsy. Heautoscopy is considered a possible explanation for doppelgänger phenomena.

The term polyopic heautoscopy refers to cases where more than one double is perceived. In 2006, Peter Brugger and his colleagues described the case of a man who experienced five doubles resulting from a tumor in the insular region of his left temporal lobe.

Another related autoscopy disorder is known as negative autoscopy (or negative heautoscopy) a psychological phenomenon in which one does not see one’s reflection when looking in a mirror. Although the effected person’s image may be seen by others, the person claims not to see it.

== See also ==
- Syndrome of subjective doubles – Delusion of having a doppelgänger
