= 9-Carboxymethoxymethylguanine =

Chemical compound

Identifiers
- IUPAC name: 2-[(2-Amino-6-oxo-3H-purin-9-yl)methoxy]acetic acid
- CAS Number: 80685-22-9
- PubChem CID: 133521
- ChemSpider: 117782
- UNII: N28227W35C
- CompTox Dashboard (EPA): DTXSID40230501

Chemical and physical data
- Formula: C_{8}H_{9}N_{5}O_{4}
- Molar mass: 239.191 g·mol^{−1}
- 3D model (JSmol): Interactive image
- SMILES: C1=NC2=C(N1COCC(=O)O)N=C(NC2=O)N
- InChI: InChI=1S/C8H9N5O4/c9-8-11-6-5(7(16)12-8)10-2-13(6)3-17-1-4(14)15/h2H,1,3H2,(H,14,15)(H3,9,11,12,16); Key:MICNQLKUSOVNNG-UHFFFAOYSA-N

9-Carboxymethoxymethylguanine (CMMG) is a compound which is known as the principal metabolite of the antiviral medication aciclovir (and its prodrug valaciclovir), and has been suggested as the causative agent in the neuropsychiatric side effects sometimes associated with these medications. These are mainly suffered by patients with kidney failure or otherwise decreased kidney function, and can include psychotic reactions, hallucinations, and rarely more complex disorders such as Cotard delusion. Patients suffering these symptoms following aciclovir treatment were found to have much higher levels of CMMG than normal, and since this is the first time Cotard delusion has been linked to a drug as a side effect, this discovery may be useful in the study of Cotard delusion and its treatment.
