= Delusional companion syndrome =

Belief that familiar objects are sentient beings

Delusional companion syndrome is considered a neuropathology of the self, specifically a delusional misidentification syndrome. Affected individuals believe certain non-living objects possess consciousness and can think independently and feel emotion. The psychosis must coexist with a detectable brain pathology for delusional companion syndrome to be diagnosed. The syndrome is most often identified in patients with damage to the brain due to physical trauma, neuronal degeneration or developmental abnormalities. Especially in the latter case, patients also tend to present with many other symptoms and are diagnosed as having other established conditions. Comforting objects like cuddly toys are often the focus of delusion.

== Causes ==
Delusional companion syndrome can be caused by acute injury or chronic disease. The following are known to have been direct causes:

- Alzheimer's disease
- Stroke
- Head trauma

== Neuropathology ==
Little detail is known about the specific causes of delusional companion syndrome. It is thought that damage to the neocortex may be the direct cause of this psychosis. Shanks and Venneri (2002) found unique and abnormal blood flow centred in the right parietal lobe of three patients with Alzheimer's disease. Severe processing deficits were found in brain areas responsible for visuospatial and visuoperceptive information, whereas memory and language abilities were preserved relatively well.

== See also ==
- Animism
