= Angor animi =

Symptom defined as a patient's perception that they are dying

- Causes: Acute coronary syndrome, pheochromocytoma

Angor animi (also referred to as angina animi, Gairdner's disease and also angina pectoris sine dolore), in medicine, is a symptom defined as a patient's perception that they are in fact dying. Most cases of angor animi are found in patients with acute coronary syndrome (cardiac-related chest pain) such as myocardial infarction. It is, however, occasionally found in patients with other conditions. Pheochromocytoma also can present with angor animi, accompanied by other symptoms that include; profuse sweating, palpitations and characteristically a pounding severe headache. Irukandji syndrome is also another reported cause.

Angor animi is differentiated from a fear or desire for death, since angor animi refers to a patient's actual and genuine belief that they are in fact dying.

== Etymology ==
The phrase is derived from the two Latin terms which it is composed of, namely angor and animi.

Angor (different from but related to the word anger in modern English), refers to a great anxiety, distress, or mental anguish often accompanied by a painful constriction and palpitations at the upper abdomen and lower thorax (chest).

Animi means an animating spirit, intention or temper.

== See also ==
- Cotard's syndrome
- Sense of impending doom
