= Woody Lissauer =

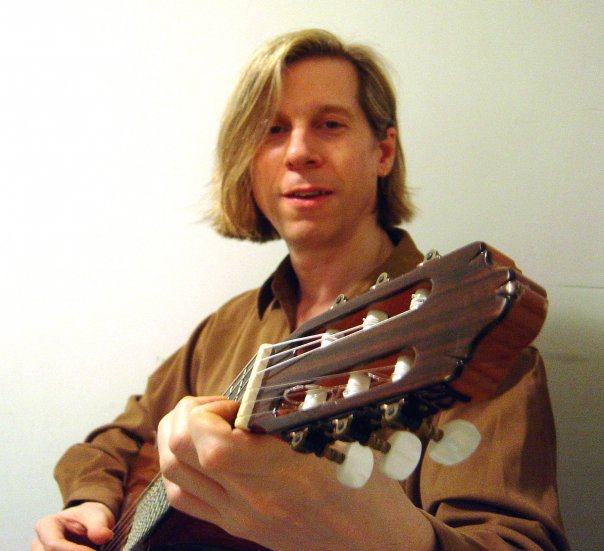
- Woody Lissauer with classical guitar.

Background information
- Born: July 9, 1959 (age 65); Baltimore, Maryland
- Origin: United States
- Genres: folk
- Occupation: singer-songwriter
- Instrument: guitar
- Years active: 1973–present
- Website: woodylissauer.com or www.woodylissauer.com

Woody Lissauer (born July 9, 1959, in Baltimore, Maryland) is a musical artist, with a large body of work going back to the 1970s.

== Early musical career ==
Lissauer was deeply involved in music from an early age. He played in a number bands in school, warmed up for Steppenwolf while still a teenager, and graduated with a degree in music composition from Towson University. He immediately joined the Gordon Michaels Band on A&M Records. Pursuing a life on the road, he traveled with Strangelove, Cinematrix (Chrysalis Records), Multiplex, Crack the Sky (Lifesong Records) and many others throughout the 1980s. Vigil producer Sam Praeger introduced Lissauer to Baltimore socialite Mark Davison, and they formed alternative-rock group Cubic Feet.

== Cubic Feet ==
Cubic Feet released Across the River featuring The Weather Girls in 1988 with the backing of Warner Music's publishing arm, Warner Chappell. The band produced three more albums, Passenger in Time, Inside Rail and Superconnector, produced by Romantics producer and Procol Harum keyboardist Peter Solley. Weathering the vicissitudes of band life, Lissauer's club work bounced from group to group playing a variety of instruments during the industry downsizing of the 1990s until he settled into solo work and a duo with Chris Noyes.

== Solo works ==
This created the germ of his series of solo CDs featuring Noyes, his sister, Kate Lissauer, an English banjo/fiddler of the Appalachian style, and others. His first solo CD, Woody Lissauer (2004) contained the radio single "Roses" and a noted version of the old English ballad, "John Barleycorn". His second solo CD, War and the World (2006), is known for the single "Shred", "Leaf", and an unusual remake of Jefferson Airplane's "Somebody to Love". His third solo CD, Adventures and Misadventures in Loveland, contains the song "Hard Times" about the recent global economic crisis, "Bent, but not broken", as well as a cover of the Leonard Cohen song "Suzanne". "Hard Times" won the October 2011 Searchlight Songwriting Competition. Lissauer's works are also featured in the Baltimore Songwriters' Association compilation CDs. "Roses", chosen by a songwriting competition, is the first track in Songs from a Charmed City, while "Leaf" is the first track on Disk 2 of Songs from our Circle 5. 2015 saw the release of the multi award-winning 'A Guest in the House of the Wind' with its environmental theme and in 2020 came the civil-rights themed 'Trouble the Water'. 2018's Song for Bowie (I Remember Your Eyes) is also notable.

Lissauer is noted for the elaborate and artistic videos he's created to accompany his compositions.
