= Robert Lissauer =

American songwriter

Robert Lissauer (May 1, 1917 – October 14, 2004) was an American composer, author, and musicologist.

Born in New York City Lissauer attended the Juilliard School and then worked with Irving Berlin on his musical This Is the Army. From this production "Yanks A Poppin" was developed as a show that could be performed for troops in the field. As a soldier in World War II, Lissauer managed a production unit that traveled across the Pacific Theater.

Working as head of his own music publishing companies in the 1960s, Lissauer signed singer-songwriters Marsha Malamet and Judy Wieder.

After the war Lissauer taught at New York University, owned a sheet music business, and managed various composers, singers, and their estates.

He also managed various composers, singers, and their estates. His extensive experience in the music industry culminated in the publication of Lissauer's Encyclopedia of Popular Music in America: 1888 to the Present. The first edition, published in 1991, listed more than 19,000 songs, and an expanded three-volume edition was issued in 1996. The encyclopedia covers a range of popular genres from the rise of Tin Pan Alley to the end of the 20th century.

Lissauer's work on the encyclopedia was driven by his understanding of the significance of songs in the American collective memory. He wrote, "No matter in which part of the country we have been raised, songs have been a part of our lives... Songs have seen us off to war, helped us elect presidents, made us laugh and made us cry, pervaded our sleep, and perhaps most importantly, have given us memories."

== Death ==
Lissauer died at Calvary Hospital in the Bronx and lived in Manhattan. He was known for his efforts to bridge the gap between past musical treasures and a generation raised on contemporary music, as evidenced by a humorous exchange with the songwriter Gerald Marks, where a young student wished Marks "good luck" with his classic song "All of Me," unaware of its established fame.

== Family ==
Lissauer's first four marriages ended in divorce. He is survived by his fifth wife, Melinda Dopper; his sister, Marion Weil of Manhattan; his children, Geoffrey of Kinderhook, New York, John of Katonah, New York, and Lianne Cisneros of Sanbornville, New Hampshire; and four grandchildren. His son John is a composer and arranger of music, and has done the scores for several popular movies.
