= Homovanillyl alcohol =

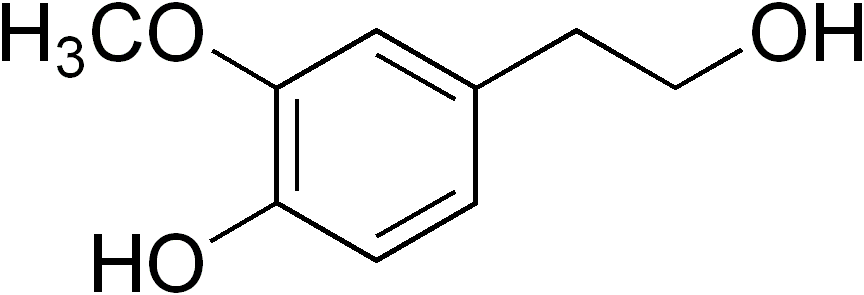

Names
- Preferred IUPAC name 4-(2-Hydroxyethyl)-2-methoxyphenol
- Other names Homovanillic alcohol; MOPET; 3-Methoxy-4-hydroxyphenylethanol; 3-Methoxy-4-hydroxyphenethyl alcohol; 4-Hydroxy-3-methoxyphenethanol, 4-Hydroxy-3-methoxyphenethyl alcohol

Identifiers
CAS Number	2380-78-1
3D model (JSmol)	Interactive image
ChEBI	CHEBI:173769
ChEMBL	ChEMBL3747068
ChemSpider	16039
ECHA InfoCard	100.017.433
EC Number	219-175-1
PubChem CID	16928
UNII	9A7EE8MS6A
CompTox Dashboard (EPA)	DTXSID40178494
- InChI: InChI=1S/C9H12O3/c1-12-9-6-7(4-5-10)2-3-8(9)11/h2-3,6,10-11H,4-5H2,1H3 Key: XHUBSJRBOQIZNI-UHFFFAOYSA-N; InChI=1/C9H12O3/c1-12-9-6-7(4-5-10)2-3-8(9)11/h2-3,6,10-11H,4-5H2,1H3 Key: XHUBSJRBOQIZNI-UHFFFAOYAP
- SMILES: Oc1ccc(cc1OC)CCO

Properties
Chemical formula	C_{9}H_{12}O_{3}
Molar mass	168.19 g/mol
Melting point	40 to 42 °C (104 to 108 °F; 313 to 315 K)

Hazards
- GHS labelling
Pictograms	(GHS07: Exclamation mark)
Signal word	Warning
Hazard statements	H315, H319, H335
Precautionary statements	P261, P264, P271, P280, P302+P352, P304+P340, P305+P351+P338, P312, P321, P332+P313, P337+P313, P362, P403+P233, P405, P501
Flash point	113 °C (235 °F; 386 K)
- Except where otherwise noted, data are given for materials in their standard state (at 25 °C [77 °F], 100 kPa). verify (what is ?) Infobox references

Homovanillyl alcohol is a metabolite of hydroxytyrosol, which in turn is a metabolite of the neurotransmitter dopamine.

== See also ==
- Homovanillic acid
