= Homovanillic acid =

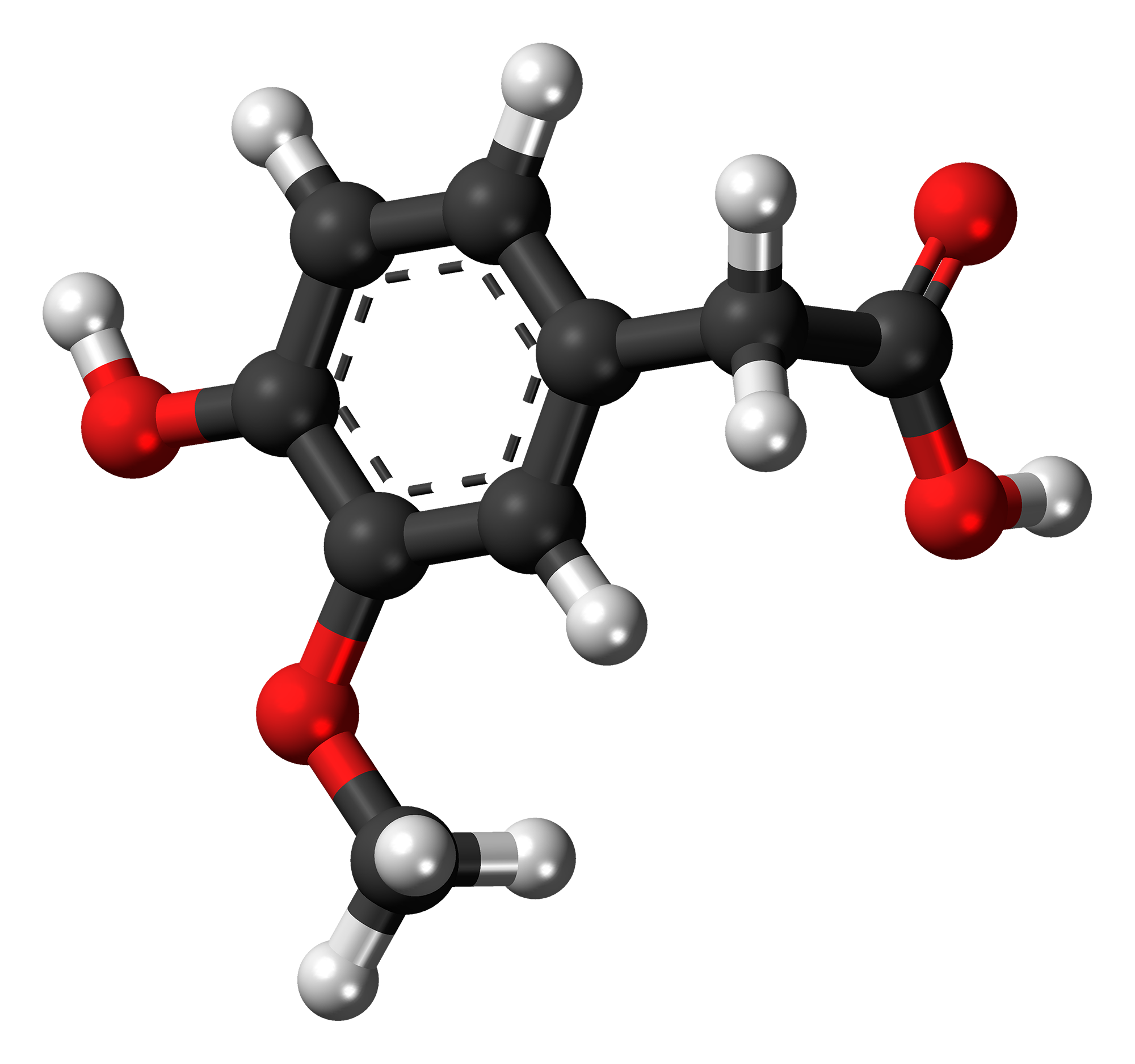

Names
- Preferred IUPAC name (4-Hydroxy-3-methoxyphenyl)acetic acid
- Other names: 2-(4-hydroxy-3-methoxyphenyl)acetic acid; 3-methoxy-4-hydroxyphenylacetic acid; 4-hydroxy-3-methoxy-benzeneacetic acid

Identifiers
CAS Number	306-08-1
3D model (JSmol)	Interactive image
ChEBI	CHEBI:545959
ChEMBL	ChEMBL1562
ChemSpider	1675
ECHA InfoCard	100.005.616
KEGG	C05582
MeSH	Homovanillic+acid
PubChem CID	1738
UNII	X77S6GMS36
CompTox Dashboard (EPA)	DTXSID5059791
- InChI: InChI=1S/C9H10O4/c1-13-8-4-6(5-9(11)12)2-3-7(8)10/h2-4,10H,5H2,1H3,(H,11,12) Key: QRMZSPFSDQBLIX-UHFFFAOYSA-N; InChI=1/C9H10O4/c1-13-8-4-6(5-9(11)12)2-3-7(8)10/h2-4,10H,5H2,1H3,(H,11,12) Key: QRMZSPFSDQBLIX-UHFFFAOYAZ
- SMILES: O=C(O)Cc1cc(OC)c(O)cc1

Properties
Chemical formula	C_{9}H_{10}O_{4}
Molar mass	182.175 g·mol^{−1}
Appearance	white solid
Melting point	138-140 °C
Solubility in water	17 mg/mL
log P	0.33
Vapor pressure	0.00000823 mmHg
Acidity (pK_{a})	pK_{a1} = 4.41 pK_{a2} = 10.53

Hazards
- GHS labelling
Pictograms	(GHS07: Exclamation mark)
Signal word	Warning
Hazard statements	H315, H319, H335
Precautionary statements	P261, P264, P264+P265, P271, P280, P302+P352, P304+P340, P305+P351+P338, P319, P321, P332+P317, P337+P317, P362+P364, P403+P233, P405, P501
- Except where otherwise noted, data are given for materials in their standard state (at 25 °C [77 °F], 100 kPa). verify (what is ?) Infobox references

Homovanillic acid (HVA) is a major catecholamine metabolite that is produced by a consecutive action of monoamine oxidase and catechol-O-methyltransferase on dopamine. Homovanillic acid is used as a reagent to detect oxidative enzymes, and is associated with dopamine levels in the brain.

In psychiatry and neuroscience, brain and cerebrospinal fluid levels of HVA are measured as a marker of metabolic stress caused by 2-deoxy-D-glucose. HVA presence supports a diagnosis of neuroblastoma and malignant pheochromocytoma.

Fasting plasma levels of HVA are known to be higher in females than in males. This does not seem to be influenced by adult hormonal changes, as the pattern is retained in the elderly and post-menopausal as well as transgender people according to their genetic sex, both before and during cross-sex hormone administration. Differences in HVA have also been correlated to tobacco usage, with smokers showing significantly lower amounts of plasma HVA.

== See also ==
- Homovanillyl alcohol
