= CDR computerized assessment system =

1970s computerized cognitive tests

The CDR system (The CDR system) is a computerized battery of cognitive tests designed in the late 1970s by Professor Keith Wesnes at the University of Reading in Berkshire, England, for repeated testing in clinical trials. Task stimuli are presented in a laptop computer and participants respond via 'YES' and 'NO' buttons on a two-button response box, which records both the accuracy and reaction time.

The CDR system is a computer based cognitive testing tool, developed to assess both enhancement and impairment of human cognitive performance. The CDR system's simplicity, sensitivity and specificity makes it acceptable to be used in clinical trials with either healthy subjects or diseased patient populations. The CDR system software is loaded onto laptop computers for testing in medical clinics. An internet version of the CDR system is available using keyboard commands to measure responses. Ancillary equipment is used for specific cognitive tests such as a postural stability (sway) meter, a critical flicker fusion device or joysticks for CDR's tracking test.

The CDR system is a series of brief neuropsychological tests that assess major aspects of cognitive function known to be influenced by a wide variety of factors including trauma, fatigue, stress, nutrition, ageing, disease (both physical and mental), medicines and drugs. The standard battery of cognitive tests in The CDR system includes immediate/delayed word recall, word recognition, picture recognition, simple reaction time, digit vigilance, choice reaction time, numeric working memory, and spatial working memory. Individual tests can be added to or removed from the battery to target specific cognitive domains. Examples of tests that can be added include measurements of executive function, mood states, social cognition, motor function and postural stability. The standard battery of tests lasts 18 minutes.

The CDR system tasks have proven validity in definitively measuring cognitive function in a variety of domains including attention, working memory, episodic secondary memory, executive function, and motor skill.

In September, 2009, Cognitive Drug Research was acquired by United BioSource Corporation, under their Bracket business unit. Ownership of Bracket was transferred to other private equity companies and merged with the former CRF Health in 2018. The post-merger organisation was named Signant Health, who continue to offer the CDR System for use in clinical research.

== See also ==
- Attention-deficit hyperactivity disorder
- Computer-based assessment
