= Capgras delusion =

Psychiatric disorder

- Other names: Capgras syndrome
- Pronunciation: /kæpˈɡrɑː/ kap-GRAH
- Specialty: Psychiatry
- Symptoms: Delusion that familiar people or pets have been replaced by identical impostors; aggression with the person suspected as an impostor
- Complications: Violence, homicide
- Causes: Uncertain; exacerbated by head injury
- Risk factors: Neuroanatomical damage, schizophrenia
- Prevention: Unknown
- Treatment: No cure; therapy generally used
- Medication: Antipsychotics

Capgras delusion or Capgras syndrome (CS) is a psychiatric disorder in which a person holds a delusion that a friend, spouse, parent, other close family member, or pet has been replaced by an identical impostor. It is named after Joseph Capgras (1873–1950), the French psychiatrist who first described the disorder.

The Capgras delusion is classified as a delusional misidentification syndrome, a class of beliefs that involves the misidentification of people, places, or objects. It can occur in acute, transient, or chronic forms. Cases in which patients hold the belief that time has been "warped" or "substituted" have also been reported.

The delusion most commonly occurs in individuals diagnosed with a psychotic disorder, usually schizophrenia; it has also been seen in brain injury, dementia with Lewy bodies, and other forms of dementia. It presents often in individuals with a neurodegenerative disease, particularly at an older age; it has also been reported as occurring in association with diabetes, hypothyroidism, and migraine attacks. In one isolated case, the Capgras delusion was temporarily induced in a healthy subject by administration of ketamine. It occurs 50% more frequently in females when compared to males.

== History ==
Capgras syndrome is named after Joseph Capgras, a French psychiatrist who first described the disorder in 1923 in his paper co-authored by Jean Reboul-Lachaux. They described the case of a French woman, "Madame Macabre", who complained that corresponding "doubles" had taken the places of her husband and other people she knew. Capgras and Reboul-Lachaux first called the syndrome "l'illusion des sosies", which can be translated literally as "the illusion of doppelgängers".

The syndrome was initially mistakenly considered purely psychiatric, as well as to be a female disorder often symptomatic of hysteria. Most of the proposed explanations initially following that of Capgras and Reboul-Lachaux were psychoanalytical in nature. It was not until the 1980s that attention turned to the usually co-existing organic brain lesions originally thought to be essentially unrelated or coincidental. Today, Capgras syndrome is understood to primarily result from neurodegenerative diseases and neurological damage, and is less commonly caused by psychotic disorders.

== Signs and symptoms ==
Symptoms of Capgras delusion include:

- A genuine belief that a close relative, friend or significant other has been replaced by an impostor.
- A sudden change of behaviour when dealing with that close relative, friend or significant other.
- Refusing to talk in the presence of the believed impostor.
- Feeling fear or anxiety in the presence of the believed impostor.
- Acting aggressively towards the believed impostor; this may include verbal outbursts, threats of violence or attempting to physically attack them.
- Acting aggressively towards other loved ones who do not believe there is an impostor.
- Feelings of agitation, anger, upset or confusion.
- Feelings of paranoia or a lack of trust towards the believed impostor and/or other close family members and friends.
- Refusing to accept any evidence that shows the believed impostor is not an impostor.
- Becoming focused or fixated on exposing the impostor.

== Prevalence ==
The prevalence of Capgras delusion (CS) in psychiatric populations (i.e., individuals with existing mental illnesses) ranges from less than 1% to 4.1%. It has the highest prevalence among individuals with psychosis, at 50% for schizophreniform psychosis, 35% for brief psychosis, and 24% for unspecified psychosis. About 15% of patients under major depressive episodes and 11% of the patients with delusional disorders and schizophrenia displayed CS symptoms.

Compared to other delusional misidentification syndromes, like the Fregoli delusion, CS is more widely documented.

== Causes ==
It is generally agreed that the Capgras delusion has a complex and organic basis and can be better understood by examining neuroanatomical damage associated with the syndrome.

In one of the first papers to consider the cerebral basis of the Capgras delusion, Alexander, Stuss and Benson pointed out in 1979 that the disorder might be related to a combination of frontal lobe damage causing problems with familiarity and right hemisphere damage causing problems with visual recognition.

Further clues to the possible causes of the Capgras delusion were suggested by the study of brain-injured patients who had developed prosopagnosia. In this condition, patients are unable to recognize faces consciously, despite being able to recognize other types of visual objects. However, a 1984 study by Bauer showed that even though conscious face recognition was impaired, patients with the condition showed autonomic arousal (measured by a galvanic skin response measure) to familiar faces, suggesting there are two pathways to face recognition—one conscious and one unconscious.

In a 1990 paper published in the British Journal of Psychiatry, psychologists Hadyn Ellis and Andy Young hypothesized that patients with Capgras delusion may have a "mirror image" or double dissociation of prosopagnosia, in that their conscious ability to recognize faces was intact, but they might have damage to the system which produces the automatic emotional arousal to familiar faces. This might lead to the experience of recognizing someone while feeling something was not "quite right" about them. In 1997, Ellis and his colleagues published a study of five patients with Capgras delusion (all diagnosed with schizophrenia) and confirmed that although they could consciously recognize the faces, they did not show the normal automatic emotional arousal response. The same low level of autonomic response was shown in the presence of strangers. Young (2008) has theorized that this means that patients with the disease experience a "loss" of familiarity, not a "lack" of it. Further evidence for this explanation comes from other studies measuring galvanic skin responses (GSR) to faces. A patient with Capgras delusion showed reduced GSRs to faces in spite of normal face recognition. This theory for the causes of Capgras delusion was summarised in Trends in Cognitive Sciences in 2001.

William Hirstein and Vilayanur S. Ramachandran reported similar findings in a paper published on a single case of a patient with Capgras delusion after brain injury. Ramachandran portrayed this case in his book Phantoms in the Brain and gave a talk about it at TED 2007. Since the patient was capable of feeling emotions and recognizing faces but could not feel emotions when recognizing familiar faces, Ramachandran hypothesizes the origin of Capgras syndrome is a disconnection between the temporal cortex, where faces are usually recognized (see temporal lobe), and the limbic system, involved in emotions. More specifically, he emphasizes the disconnection between the amygdala and the inferotemporal cortex.

In 2010, Hirstein revised this theory to explain why a person with Capgras syndrome would have the particular reaction of not recognizing a familiar person. Hirstein explained the theory as being "a more specific version of the earlier position I took in the 1997 article with V. S. Ramachandran," and elaborated:

According to my current approach, we represent the people we know well with hybrid representations containing two parts. One part represents them externally: how they look, sound, etc. The other part represents them internally: their personalities, beliefs, characteristic emotions, preferences, etc. Capgras syndrome occurs when the internal portion of the representation is damaged or inaccessible. This produces the impression of someone who looks right on the outside, but seems different on the inside, i.e., an impostor. This gives a much more specific explanation that fits well with what the patients actually say. It corrects a problem with the earlier hypothesis in that there are many possible responses to the lack of an emotion upon seeing someone.

Furthermore, Ramachandran suggests a relationship between the Capgras syndrome and a more general difficulty in linking successive episodic memories because of the crucial role emotion plays in creating memories. Since the patient could not put together memories and feelings, he believed objects in a photograph were new on every viewing, even though they normally should have evoked feelings (e.g., a person close to him, a familiar object, or even himself). Others like Merrin and Silberfarb (1976) have also proposed links between the Capgras syndrome and deficits in aspects of memory. They suggest that an important and familiar person (the usual subject of the delusion) has many layers of visual, auditory, tactile, and experiential memories associated with them, so the Capgras delusion can be understood as a failure of object constancy at a high perceptual level.

Most likely, more than a mere impairment of the automatic emotional arousal response is necessary to form the Capgras delusion, as the same pattern has been reported in patients showing no signs of delusions. Ellis suggested that a second factor explains why this unusual experience is transformed into a delusional belief; this second factor is thought to be an impairment in reasoning, although no specific impairment has been found to explain all cases. Many have argued for the inclusion of the role of patient phenomenology in explanatory models of the Capgras syndrome in order to better understand the mechanisms that enable the creation and maintenance of delusional beliefs.

Capgras syndrome has also been linked to reduplicative paramnesia, another delusional misidentification syndrome in which a person believes a location has been duplicated or relocated. Since these two syndromes are highly associated, it has been proposed that they affect similar areas of the brain and therefore have similar neurological implications. Reduplicative paramnesia is understood to affect the frontal lobe, and thus it is believed that Capgras syndrome is also associated with the frontal lobe. Even if the damage is not directly to the frontal lobe, an interruption of signals between other lobes and the frontal lobe could result in Capgras syndrome. One 2022 case study following a 28-year-old male patient without a previous history of psychiatric illnesses or Capgras-associated physical illnesses highlights the potential for heavy cannabinoid consumption to function as a trigger for Capgras syndrome. The authors of this 2022 case study referred to recreational drug use triggered Capgras syndrome as being an extremely rare condition with infrequent documentation which therefore requires first ruling out other potential triggers and direct causes associated with Capgras syndrome. A 2019 systematic review of 255 published cases of Capgras syndrome in the scientific literature had found 7 known cases where the syndrome occurred with cannabis use or cannabinoid consumption as a reported possible trigger.

== Diagnosis ==
Because it is a rare and poorly understood condition, there is no established way to diagnose the Capgras delusion. Diagnosis is primarily made on a psychiatric evaluation of the patient, who is most likely brought to a psychiatrist's attention by a family member or friend believed to be an impostor by the person under the delusion. The patient may undergo mental skills tests to check for dementia or other conditions, and brain imaging tests like MRI or EEG that look for lesions or other brain changes.

== Treatment ==
Treatment of Capgras delusion has not been well studied, so there is no evidence-based approach. Typically, treatment of delusional disorders is challenging due to poor patient insight and lack of empirical data. Treatment is generally therapy, often with support of antipsychotic medication. As manifestation of Capgras delusion is often a symptom rather than a syndrome itself, treatment may focus on the accompanying condition. A study has shown that using medications appropriately to target the underlying disorder's core symptoms can be an effective management strategy. Hospitalization may be necessary, if the patient is engaging in self-harm or violence.

== See also ==
- B.J. Penn
- Bridget Cleary
- Cotard's syndrome, the belief that one is dead, decaying, does not exist, or has lost their blood or internal organs
- Cognitive neuropsychiatry
- Doppelgänger
- Fregoli delusion, the belief that different people are in fact a single person who changes appearance or is in disguise
- Intermetamorphosis
- Invasion of the Body Snatchers
- Jamais vu
- List of impostors
- Monothematic delusion
- Paul is dead
- Personation
- Reality
- Reduplicative paramnesia
- Reptilian conspiracy theory
