= Reduplicative paramnesia =

Delusional belief that a location has been duplicated or relocated

- Specialty: Psychiatry

Reduplicative paramnesia is the delusional belief that a place or location has been duplicated, existing in two or more places simultaneously, or that it has been relocated to another site. It is one of the delusional misidentification syndromes; although rare, it is most commonly associated with traumatic or acquired brain injury, such as stroke, particularly when there is simultaneous damage to the right cerebral hemisphere and to both frontal lobes.

== Presentation ==
Reduplicative paramnesia has been reported in the context of a number of neurological disorders, including stroke, intracerebral hemorrhage, tumor, dementia, encephalopathy and various psychiatric disorders.

Taken from the Benson and colleagues study, the following example illustrates some of the core features of the delusion. In this instance, the patient had had a head injury after a fall in his home. The impact had caused a fractured skull and frontal lobe damage to both sides (although more pronounced on the right) owing to the formation of intracerebral hematomas:

A few days after admission to the Neurobehavioural Center, orientation for time was intact, he could give details of the accident (as related to him by others), could remember his doctors' names and could learn new information and retain it indefinitely. He exhibited, however, a distinct abnormality of orientation for place. While he quickly learned and remembered that he was at the Jamaica Plain Veterans Hospital (also known as the Boston Veterans Administration Hospital), he insisted that the hospital was located in Taunton, Massachusetts, his home town. Under close questioning, he acknowledged that Jamaica Plain was part of Boston and admitted it would be strange for there to be two Jamaica Plain Veterans Hospitals. Nonetheless, he insisted that he was presently hospitalized in a branch of the Jamaica Plain Veterans Hospital located in Taunton. At one time he stated that the hospital was located in the spare bedroom of his house.

The illusory relocation to a familiar place (such as a home or town the patient knows well) is a common theme, although occasionally the patient may believe that they are resident in more fantastical or exotic locations.

== Mechanism ==
Early psychodynamic explanations suggested that reduplicative paramnesia was not directly connected to brain injury, but arises from a motivated denial of illness; particularly, as Weinstein and Kahn claimed, in those that regard illness as an "imperfection, weakness or disgrace". Other early investigators did accept that brain injury was an important factor, but suggested that the disorientation was a "hysterical reaction" motivated by a desire to return home.

The majority of modern theories, however, suggest that the disorder is caused by disruption to the brain systems involved in memory and familiarity. This was the theme of Pick's original explanation, in which he suggested that the crucial mechanism was a "convulsive attack" that disrupted conscious memory.

Benson and colleagues later argued that damage to the right hemisphere of the brain rendered patients unable to maintain orientation owing to impaired visuospatial perception and visual memory, while frontal lobe damage made it difficult to inhibit the false impressions caused by disorientation.

More recent research has broadly supported this view, and links have been made to the literature on confabulation, where patients seem to recall false memories without any realisation that they are false, often also in the context of frontal lobe damage. Right hemisphere damage is also linked to anosognosia, where patients seem unaware of often striking disabilities present after brain injury, also suggesting a link to the lack of insight seen in this disorder.

One case study has suggested a more refined explanation, suggesting that damage to the ventral stream of the visual system, which connects the visual cortex to areas in the temporal lobes, could produce the required visuospatial disorientation and poor memory integration. The temporal areas (including the hippocampus) are known strongly to interact with the frontal lobes during memory formation and retrieval, suggesting an explanation for why frontal damage could also lead to the condition.

== History ==
The term reduplicative paramnesia was first used in 1903 by psychiatrist Arnold Pick to describe a condition in a patient with suspected Alzheimer's disease who insisted that she had been moved from Pick's city clinic to one she claimed looked identical but was in a familiar suburb. To explain the discrepancy she further claimed that Pick and the medical staff worked at both locations.

In retrospect, however, the phenomenon has been found to have been first reported by the Swiss naturalist Charles Bonnet in 1788, who described a woman who also had what would now be called Cotard delusion. Henry Head and Paterson and Zangwill later reported on soldiers who had the delusional belief that their hospital was located in their home town, although in these cases traumatic brain injury seemed to be the most likely cause.

It wasn't until 1976 that serious consideration was given to the disorder, when three cases were reported by Benson and colleagues. Benson not only described striking reduplication syndromes in his patients, but also attempted to explain the phenomena in terms of the neurocognitive deficits also present in the patients. This was one of the first attempts to give a neuropsychological explanation for the disorder.

== See also ==
- Capgras delusion – Psychiatric disorder
- Delusional misidentification syndrome – Psychological disorder
- Jamais vu – Phenomenon in psychology
- Paramnesia (Commonly called Déjà vu)
