= Delusion =

Fixation of holding false beliefs

A delusion (Note: From Latin delusio lit. 'deceiving', from deludere 'to mock, to deceive') is a fixed belief that is not amenable to change in light of conflicting evidence. As a pathology (delusional disorder), it is distinct from a belief based on false or incomplete information, confabulation, dogma, illusion, hallucination, or some other misleading effects of perception, as individuals with those beliefs are able to change or readjust their beliefs upon reviewing the evidence. However:

"The distinction between a delusion and a strongly held idea is sometimes difficult to make and depends in part on the degree of conviction with which the belief is held despite clear or reasonable contradictory evidence regarding its veracity."

Delusions occur in the context of many pathological states (both general physical and mental) and are of particular diagnostic importance in psychotic disorders including schizophrenia, paraphrenia, manic episodes of bipolar disorder, and psychotic depression.

== Types ==
Delusions are categorized into four different groups:

Bizarre delusion
Delusions are deemed bizarre if they are clearly implausible and not understandable to same-culture peers and do not derive from ordinary life experiences. An example named by the DSM-5 is a belief that someone replaced all of one's internal organs with someone else's without leaving a scar, depending on the organ in question.
Non-bizarre delusion
A delusion that, though false, reflects real-life situations and is at least technically possible; it may include feelings of being followed, poisoned, infected, etc. e.g., the affected person mistakenly believes that they are under constant police surveillance or that a person or a group of people are plotting the affected person's downfall.
Mood-congruent delusion
Any delusion with content consistent with either a depressive or manic state, e.g., a depressed person believes that news anchors on television highly disapprove of them, or a person in a manic state might believe they are a powerful deity.
Mood-neutral delusion
A delusion that does not relate to the patient's emotional state; for example, a belief that an extra limb is growing out of the back of one's head is neutral to either depression or mania.

French psychiatry (which is influenced by psychoanalysis), however, also establishes a difference between "paranoid" (paranoïde) and "paranoiac" (paranoïaque) delusion. The paranoid delusion, observed in schizophrenia, is non-systematized and is characterized by a disorganized structure and confused speech and thoughts. The paranoiac delusion, observed in paraphrenia, is highly systematized (which means it is very organized and clear) and focuses on a single theme.

=== Themes ===
In addition to these categories, delusions often manifest according to a consistent theme. Although delusions can have any theme, certain themes are more common. Some of the more common delusion themes are:

- Delusion of control: False belief that another person, group of people, or external force controls one's general thoughts, feelings, impulses, or behaviors.
- Delusional jealousy: False belief that a spouse or lover is having an affair, with no proof to back up the claim.
- Delusion of guilt or sin (or delusion of self-accusation): Ungrounded feeling of remorse or guilt of delusional intensity.
- Thought broadcasting: False belief that other people can know one's thoughts.
- Delusion of thought insertion: Belief that another thinks through the mind of the person or projects thoughts onto the person's mind.
- Persecutory delusions: False belief that one is being persecuted.
- Delusion of reference: False belief that insignificant remarks, events, or objects in one's environment have personal meaning or significance. "Usually the meaning assigned to these events is negative, but the 'messages' can also have a grandiose quality."
- Erotomania: False belief that another person is in love with them, usually a rich, famous, or powerful figure [Ex: The King of England].
- Religious delusion: Belief that the affected person is a god or chosen to act as a god.
- Somatic delusion: Delusion whose content pertains to bodily functioning, bodily sensations or physical appearance. Usually the false belief is that the body is somehow diseased, abnormal or changed. A specific example of this delusion is delusional parasitosis: Delusion in which one feels infested with insects, bacteria, mites, spiders, lice, fleas, worms, or other organisms.
- Delusion of poverty: Person strongly believes they are financially incapacitated. Although this type of delusion is less common now, it was particularly widespread in the days preceding state support.

=== Grandiose delusions ===
Grandiose delusions or delusions of grandeur are principally a subtype of delusional disorder but could possibly feature as a symptom of schizophrenia and manic episodes of bipolar disorder. Grandiose delusions are characterized by fantastical beliefs that one is famous, omnipotent or otherwise very powerful. The delusions are generally fantastical, often with a supernatural, science-fictional, or religious bent. In colloquial usage, one who overestimates one's own abilities, talents, stature or situation is sometimes said to have "delusions of grandeur". This is generally due to excessive pride, rather than any actual delusions. Grandiose delusions or delusions of grandeur can also be associated with megalomania.

=== Persecutory delusions ===
Persecutory delusions are the most common type of delusions and involve the theme of being followed, harassed, cheated, poisoned or drugged, conspired against, spied on, attacked, or otherwise obstructed in the pursuit of goals. The person affected by a persecutory delusion wrongly believes that they are being persecuted. Specifically, for a person's delusion to be defined as persecutory, they must believe the following two central elements:

- harm is occurring, or is going to occur
- the persecutors have the intention to cause harm

According to the DSM-IV-TR, persecutory delusions are the most common form of delusions in schizophrenia, where the person believes they are "being tormented, followed, sabotaged, tricked, spied on, or ridiculed". The DSM-IV-TR also identifies persecutory delusions as the main feature of the persecutory type of delusional disorder. When the focus is remedying some injustice by legal action, they are sometimes called "querulous paranoia".

== Causes ==
While explaining the causes of delusions remains a challenge, researchers have developed several theories. The genetic or biological theory holds that close relatives of people with delusional disorder are at increased risk of developing delusional traits. Another theory is dysfunctional cognitive processing, according to which delusions arise from distorted ways in which individuals view themselves. A third theory is motivated or defensive delusions, according to which individuals who are predisposed to delusional disorder may develop it at times when they are struggling to cope with life and maintaining high self-esteem. In this case, the person views others as the cause of their personal difficulties in order to preserve a positive self-concept.

Delusional thinking is more common among people who have poor hearing or sight. The probability of developing delusions is also higher where there are ongoing stressors, such as immigration, low socioeconomic status, and possibly the accumulation of smaller daily struggles.

=== Specific delusions ===
The two largest factors in the formation of delusions are disorders of brain functioning and background influences of temperament and personality.

Higher levels of dopamine are a sign of disorders of brain functioning. A preliminary 2002 study on delusional disorder (a psychotic syndrome) examined the role of elevated dopamine levels in sustaining certain delusions, in order to establish whether schizophrenia was linked to dopamine abnormalities. The results confirmed the theory, showing that individuals with delusions of jealousy and persecution had different levels of dopamine metabolite HVA and homovanillyl alcohol; the cause of this may in turn be genetic. The authors cautioned that the results were preliminary and called for future research with a larger population. Also, factors beyond dopamine impact the development of a specific delusion; studies show age and gender are influential and HVA levels likely change during the life course of some syndromes.

On the influence of personality, Andrew Sims wrote: "Jaspers considered there is a subtle change in personality due to the illness itself; and this creates the condition for the development of the delusional atmosphere in which the delusional intuition arises."

Cultural factors have "a decisive influence in shaping delusions". For example, delusions of guilt and punishment are frequent in Austria (a Western, Christian country), but not in Pakistan, where delusions are more often about persecution. Similarly, in a series of case studies, delusions of guilt and punishment were found in Austrian patients with Parkinson's disease being treated with l-dopa, a dopamine agonist.

== Pathophysiology ==
The two-factor model of delusions posits that dysfunction in both belief formation systems and belief evaluation systems are necessary for delusions. Neuroimaging studies support the view that dysfunction in evaluations systems is localized to the right lateral prefrontal cortex, regardless of delusion content, and this is congruent with its role in conflict monitoring in healthy persons. Abnormal activation and reduced volume in this region are seen in people with delusions, as well as in disorders associated with delusions such as frontotemporal dementia, psychosis and Lewy body dementia. Furthermore, lesions to the right lateral prefrontal cortex are associated with "jumping to conclusions", damage to this region is associated with post-stroke delusions, and hypometabolism in this region is associated with caudate strokes presenting with delusions.

The aberrant salience model suggests that delusions are a result of people assigning excessive importance to irrelevant stimuli. In support of this hypothesis, regions normally associated with the salience network demonstrate reduced grey matter in people with delusions, and the neurotransmitter dopamine, which is widely implicated in salience processing, is also widely implicated in psychotic disorders.

Abnormalities in specific regions have been associated with specific types of delusions. The volume of the hippocampus and parahippocampus is related to paranoid delusions in Alzheimer's disease, and has been reported to be abnormal post mortem in one person with delusions. Capgras delusions have been associated with occipito-temporal damage and may be related to failure to elicit normal emotions or memories in response to faces.

== Definition and diagnosis ==
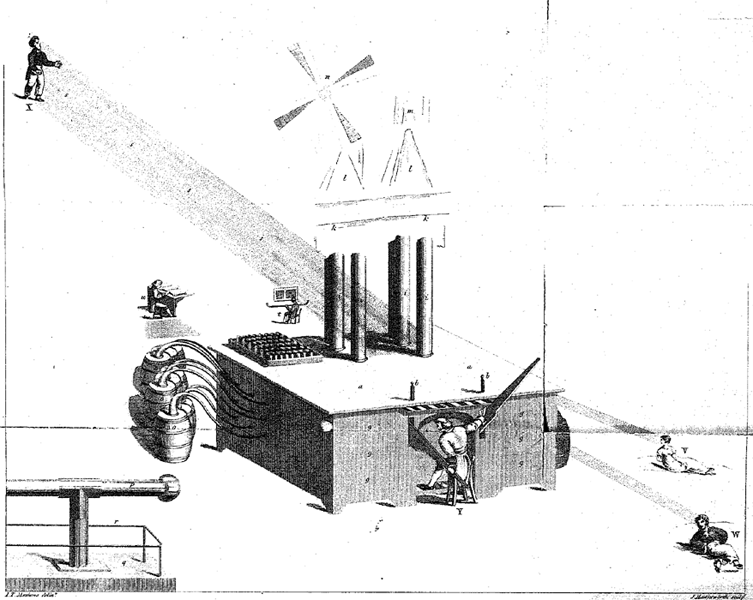
James Tilly Matthews illustrated this picture of a machine called an "air loom", which he believed was being used to torture him and others for political purposes.

Although non-specific concepts of madness have been around for several thousand years, the psychiatrist and philosopher Karl Jaspers was the first to define the four main criteria for a belief to be considered delusional in his 1913 book General Psychopathology. These criteria are:

1. certainty (held with absolute conviction)
2. incorrigibility (not changeable by compelling counterargument or proof to the contrary)
3. impossibility or falsity of content (implausible, bizarre, or patently untrue)
4. not amenable to understanding (i.e., belief cannot be explained psychologically)

Furthermore, when beliefs involve value judgments, only those which cannot be proven true are considered delusions. For example: a man claiming that he flew into the Sun and flew back home. This would be considered a delusion, unless he were speaking figuratively, or if the belief had a cultural or religious source. Only the first three criteria remain cornerstones of the current definition of a delusion in the DSM-5.

Robert Trivers writes that delusion is a discrepancy in relation to objective reality, but with a firm conviction in reality of delusional ideas, which is manifested in the "affective basis of delusion".

=== Debate over definitions ===
The modern definition and Jaspers' original criteria have been criticised, as counter-examples can be shown for every defining feature.

Studies on psychiatric patients show that delusions vary in intensity and conviction over time, which suggests that certainty and incorrigibility are not necessary components of a delusional belief.

Delusions do not necessarily have to be false or "incorrect inferences about external reality". Some religious or spiritual beliefs by their nature may not be falsifiable, and hence cannot be described as false or incorrect, no matter whether the person holding these beliefs was diagnosed as delusional or not. In other situations the delusion may turn out to be true belief. For example, in delusional jealousy, where a person believes that their partner is being unfaithful (and may even follow them into the bathroom believing them to be seeing their lover even during the briefest of partings), it may actually be true that the partner is having sexual relations with another person. In this case, the delusion does not cease to be a delusion because the content later turns out to be verified as true or the partner actually chose to engage in the behavior of which they were being accused.

In other cases, the belief may be mistakenly assumed to be false by a doctor or psychiatrist assessing it, just because it seems to be unlikely, bizarre or held with excessive conviction. Psychiatrists rarely have the time or resources to check the validity of a person's claims leading to some true beliefs to be erroneously classified as delusional. This is known as the Martha Mitchell effect, after the wife of the attorney general who alleged that illegal activity was taking place in the White House. At the time, her claims were thought to be signs of mental illness, and only after the Watergate scandal broke was she proved right (and hence sane).

Similar factors have led to criticisms of Jaspers' definition of true delusions as being ultimately "un-understandable". Critics (such as R. D. Laing) have argued that this leads to the diagnosis of delusions being based on the subjective understanding of a particular psychiatrist, who may not have access to all the information that might make a belief otherwise interpretable. R. D. Laing's hypothesis has been applied to some forms of projective therapy to "fix" a delusional system so that it cannot be altered by the patient. Psychiatric researchers at Yale University, Ohio State University and the Community Mental Health Center of Middle Georgia have used novels and motion picture films as the focus. Texts, plots and cinematography are discussed and the delusions approached tangentially. This use of fiction to decrease the malleability of a delusion was employed in a joint project by science-fiction author Philip José Farmer and Yale psychiatrist A. James Giannini. They wrote the novel Red Orc's Rage, which, recursively, deals with delusional adolescents who are treated with a form of projective therapy. In this novel's fictional setting other novels written by Farmer are discussed and the characters are symbolically integrated into the delusions of fictional patients. This particular novel was then applied to real-life clinical settings.

Another difficulty with the diagnosis of delusions is that almost all of these features can be found in "normal" beliefs. Many religious beliefs hold exactly the same features, yet are not universally considered delusional. For instance, if a person was holding a true belief then they will of course persist with it. This can cause the disorder to be misdiagnosed by psychiatrists. These factors have led the psychiatrist Anthony David to note that "there is no acceptable (rather than accepted) definition of a delusion." In practice, psychiatrists tend to diagnose a belief as delusional if it is either patently bizarre, causing significant distress, or excessively pre-occupying the patient, especially if the person is subsequently unswayed in belief by counter-evidence or reasonable arguments.

Psychiatrist Joseph Pierre states that one factor that helps differentiate delusions from other kinds of beliefs is that anomalous subjective experiences are often used to justify delusional beliefs. While idiosyncratic and self-referential content often make delusions impossible to share with others, Pierre suggests that it may be more helpful to emphasize the level of conviction, preoccupation, and extension of a belief rather than the content of the belief when considering whether a belief is delusional.

It is important to distinguish true delusions from other symptoms such as anxiety, fear, or paranoia. To diagnose delusions a mental state examination may be used. This test includes appearance, mood, affect, behavior, rate and continuity of speech, evidence of hallucinations or abnormal beliefs, thought content, orientation to time, place and person, attention and concentration, insight and judgment, as well as short-term memory.

Johnson-Laird suggests that delusions may be viewed as the natural consequence of failure to distinguish conceptual relevance. That is, irrelevant information would be framed as disconnected experiences, then it is taken to be relevant in a manner that suggests false causal connections. Furthermore, relevant information would be ignored as counterexamples.

== Treatment ==
Delusions and other positive symptoms of psychosis are often treated with antipsychotic medication, which reduce symptoms with a medium effect size according to a meta-analysis. Cognitive behavioral therapy (CBT) improves delusions relative to control conditions according to a meta-analysis. A meta-analysis of 43 studies reported that metacognitive training (MCT) reduces delusions at a medium to large effect size relative to control conditions.

== Criticism ==
Some psychiatrists criticize the practice of defining one and the same belief as normal in one culture and pathological in another culture, arguing that it is based in cultural essentialism. They argue that it is not justified to assume that culture can be simplified to a few traceable, distinguishable and statistically quantifiable factors and that everything outside those factors must be biological; rather, cultural influences are mixed, including not only parents and teachers but also peers, friends, and media, and the same cultural influence can have different effects depending on earlier cultural influences. Other critical psychiatrists argue that just because a person's belief is unshaken by one influence does not prove that it would remain unshaken by another. For example, a person whose beliefs are not changed by verbal correction from a psychiatrist, which is how delusion is usually diagnosed, may still change his or her mind when observing empirical evidence; the critics state that psychiatrists rarely, if ever, present patients with such evidence.

== See also ==
- Bizarre object – Wilfred Bion concept
- Clinical lycanthropy – Delusion of being a non-human animal
- Cotard's delusion – Delusion that one is dead or non-existent
- Delirium – Severe confusion that develops quickly, and often fluctuates in intensity
- Delusional misidentification syndrome – Psychological disorder
- Folie à deux – Shared psychosis, a psychotic disorder
- Hallucination – Perception that only seems real
- Intrusive thoughts – Unwelcome involuntary thought, image or idea
- Jerusalem syndrome – Group of mental phenomena
- Mass hysteria – Spread of illness without organic cause
- Monothematic delusion – Delusional state focused on one topic
- Paris syndrome – Form of tourist disillusionment
- Prelest – Concept in Eastern Orthodox Christianity
- Reduplicative paramnesia – Delusional belief that a location has been duplicated or relocated
