= Cotard's syndrome =

Delusion that one is dead or non-existent

- Other names: Cotard's delusion, walking corpse syndrome
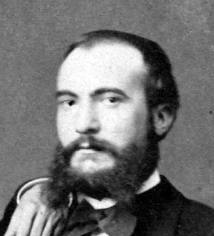
- French neurologist and psychiatrist Jules Cotard (1840–1889) described "The Delusion of Negation" (Cotard's Syndrome) as a mental illness of varying severity.
- Specialty: Psychiatry
- Symptoms: Delusion that one does not exist, is dead, missing organs, limbs, blood, or is incapable of dying (immortal)
- Complications: Self-harm, suicide
- Diagnostic method: Psychiatric evaluation

Cotard's syndrome, also known as Cotard's delusion or walking corpse syndrome, is a mental disorder in which the affected person holds the delusional belief that they are deceased, do not exist, are putrefying, or have lost their blood or internal organs. Statistical analysis of a hundred-patient cohort indicated that denial of self-existence is present in 45% of the cases of Cotard's syndrome; the other 55% of the patients presented with delusions of immortality.

In 1880, the neurologist and psychiatrist Jules Cotard described the condition as le délire des négations ("the delusion of negation"), a psychiatric syndrome of varied severity. A mild case is characterized by despair and self-loathing, while a severe case is characterized by intense delusions of negation, and chronic psychiatric depression.

The case of "Mademoiselle X" describes a woman who denied the existence of parts of her body (somatoparaphrenia) and of her need to eat. She claimed that she was condemned to eternal damnation and therefore could not die a natural death. In the course of experiencing "the delusion of negation", Mademoiselle X died of starvation.

Cotard's syndrome is not mentioned in either the Diagnostic and Statistical Manual of Mental Disorders (DSM) or the 10th edition of the International Statistical Classification of Diseases and Related Health Problems (ICD-10) of the World Health Organization.

== Signs and symptoms ==
Delusions of negation are the central symptom in Cotard's syndrome. The patient usually denies their own existence, the existence of a certain body part, or the existence of a portion of their body. Cotard's syndrome exists in three stages:

1. Germination stage: symptoms such as psychotic depression and hypochondria often appear;
2. Blooming stage: full development of the syndrome and delusions of negation; and;
3. Chronic stage: continued severe delusions along with chronic psychiatric depression.

Cotard's syndrome withdraws the person with the condition from other people due to neglect of their personal hygiene and physical health. Delusions of negation of self prevent the patient from making sense of external reality, which then produces a distorted view of the external world. Such delusions of negation are usually found in schizophrenia. Although a diagnosis of Cotard's syndrome does not require the patient to have had hallucinations, the strong delusions of negation are comparable to those found in schizophrenic patients.

=== Distorted reality ===
The article Betwixt Life and Death: Case Studies of the Cotard Delusion (1996) describes a contemporary case of Cotard's syndrome which occurred in a Scotsman whose brain was damaged in a motorcycle accident:

[The patient's] symptoms occurred in the context of more general feelings of unreality and [of] being dead. In January 1990, after his discharge from hospital in Edinburgh, his mother took him to South Africa. He was convinced that he had been taken to Hell (which was confirmed by the heat) and that he had died of sepsis (which had been a risk early in his recovery), or perhaps from AIDS (he had read a story in The Scotsman about someone with AIDS who died from sepsis), or from an overdose of a yellow fever injection. He thought he had "borrowed [his] mother's spirit to show [him] around Hell" and that she was asleep in Scotland.

The article Recurrent Postictal Depression with Cotard Delusion (2005) describes the case of a 14-year-old epileptic boy who experienced Cotard's syndrome after seizures. His mental health history showed themes of death, chronic sadness, decreased physical activity in leisure time, social withdrawal, and problematic biological functions.

About twice a year, the boy had episodes that lasted between three weeks and three months. In the course of each episode, he said that everyone and everything was dead (including trees), described himself as a dead body, and warned that the world would be destroyed within hours. Throughout the episode, the boy showed no response to pleasurable stimuli, and had no interest in social activities.

== Pathophysiology ==
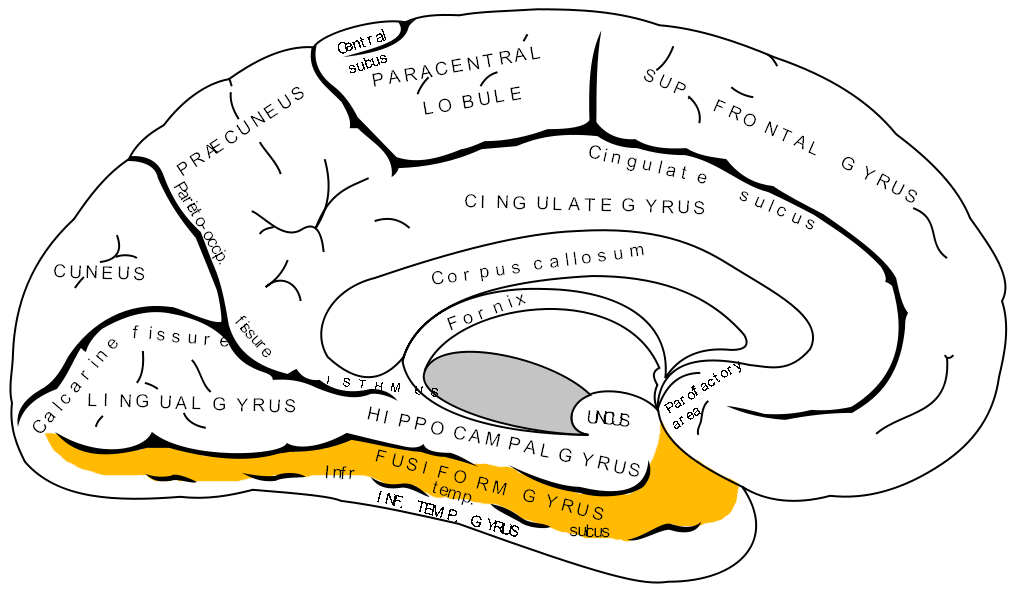
Neural misfiring in the fusiform face area, in the fusiform gyrus (orange), might be a cause of Cotard's syndrome.

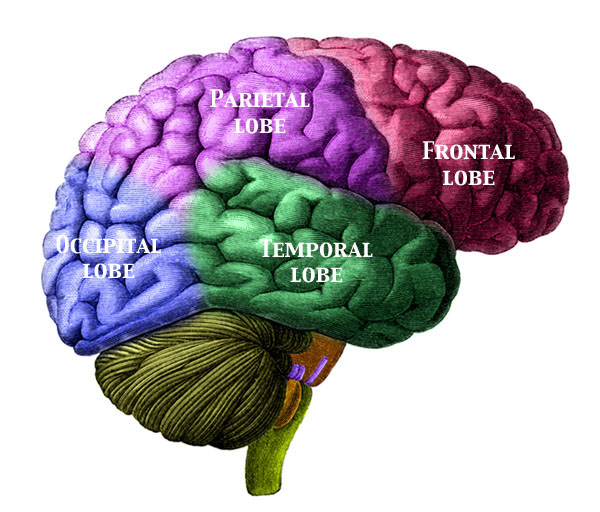
In the cerebrum, organic lesions in the parietal lobe might cause Cotard's syndrome.

The underlying neurophysiology and psychopathology of Cotard's syndrome might be related to problems of delusional misidentification. Neurologically, Cotard's syndrome (negation of the self) is thought to be related to Capgras delusion (people replaced by impostors); each type of delusion is thought to result from neural misfiring in the fusiform face area of the brain, which recognizes faces, and in the amygdalae, which associate emotions to a recognized face.

The neural disconnection creates in the patient a sense that the face they are observing is not the face of the person to whom it belongs; therefore, that face lacks the familiarity (recognition) normally associated with it. This results in derealization or a disconnection from the environment. If the observed face is that of a person known to the patient, they experience that face as the face of an impostor (Capgras delusion). If the patient sees their own face, they might perceive no association between the face and their own sense of self—which results in the patient believing that they do not exist (Cotard's syndrome).

Cotard's syndrome is usually encountered in people with psychosis, as in schizophrenia. It is also found in clinical depression, derealization, brain tumor, and migraine headaches. The medical literature indicates that the occurrence of Cotard's syndrome is associated with lesions in the parietal lobe. As such, Cotard's syndrome patients present a greater incidence of brain atrophy—especially of the median frontal lobe—than do people in control groups.

Cotard's syndrome also has resulted from a patient's adverse physiological response to a drug (e.g., acyclovir) and to its prodrug precursor (e.g., valaciclovir). The occurrence of Cotard's syndrome symptoms was associated with a high serum-concentration of 9-carboxymethoxymethylguanine (CMMG), the principal metabolite of acyclovir.

As such, the patient with weak kidneys (impaired renal function) continued risking the occurrence of delusional symptoms despite the reduction of the dose of acyclovir. Hemodialysis resolved the patient's delusions (of negating the self) within hours of treatment, which suggests that the occurrence of Cotard's syndrome symptoms might not always be cause for psychiatric hospitalization of the patient.

== Treatment ==
Pharmacological treatments, both mono-therapeutic and multi-therapeutic, using antidepressants, antipsychotics, and mood stabilizers have been successful. Likewise, with the depressed patient, electroconvulsive therapy (ECT) is more effective than pharmacotherapy.

Cotard's syndrome resulting from an adverse drug reaction to valaciclovir is attributed to elevated serum concentration of one of valaciclovir's metabolites, 9-carboxymethoxymethylguanine (CMMG). Successful treatment warrants cessation of valaciclovir. Hemodialysis was associated with timely clearance of CMMG and resolution of symptoms.

== Case studies ==
- One patient, called WI for privacy reasons, was diagnosed with Cotard's syndrome after experiencing significant traumatic brain damage. Damage to the cerebral hemisphere, frontal lobe, and the ventricular system was apparent to WI's doctors after examining magnetic resonance imaging (MRI) and computed tomography (CT) scans. In January 1990, WI was discharged to outpatient care. Although his family had made arrangements for him to travel abroad, he continued to experience significant persistent visual difficulties, which provoked a referral for ophthalmological assessment. Formal visual testing then led to the discovery of further damage. For several months after the initial trauma, WI continued to experience difficulty recognizing familiar faces, places, and objects. He was also convinced that he was dead and experienced feelings of derealization. Later in 1990, after being discharged from the hospital, WI was convinced that he had gone to Hell after dying of either AIDS or sepsis. When WI finally sought out neurological testing in May 1990, he was no longer fully convinced that he was dead, although he still suspected it. Further testing revealed that WI was able to distinguish between dead and alive individuals with the exception of himself. When WI was treated for depression, his delusions of his own death diminished in a month.
- In November 2016, the Daily Mirror newspaper carried a report of Warren McKinlay of Braintree in Essex, who developed Cotard's syndrome following a serious motorbike accident.

== Society and culture ==
The protagonist of Charlie Kaufman's 2008 movie Synecdoche, New York is named Caden Cotard. Throughout the film Cotard thinks he is dying, and other examples of Cotard's syndrome are shown with scenes such as when his daughter, Olive, begins to scream about having blood in her body and, as the film goes on, Cotard disappears from the play he is writing about his own life and is portrayed by other actors as he takes the role of a cleaning lady.

It is speculated that Per "Dead" Ohlin, lead vocalist for the black metal bands Mayhem and Morbid, had Cotard's syndrome as a result of an assault by bullies in his youth that left him clinically dead for a short time. He developed an obsession with death shortly after (hence his stage name and use of corpse paint), often self-harmed onstage and among friends, became increasingly depressed and introverted, and died by suicide in 1991.

In series four of the BBC crime drama series Luther, protagonist DCI John Luther trails a cannibalistic serial killer with Cotard's syndrome.

In season one, episode 10, of the NBC television series Hannibal, protagonist Will Graham trails a killer with Cotard's syndrome.

In season four, episode 14, of the TV series Scrubs, a patient who is said to have Cotard's syndrome believes that he died years earlier.

The 2016 Will Wood and the Tapeworms album Self-Ish contains the song "Cotard's Solution (Anatta, Dukkha, Anicca)", referencing Cotard's syndrome.

The author Esmé Weijun Wang used to suffer from Cotard's syndrome, and her experience of the condition is a key element of her essay collection The Collected Schizophrenias.

In the British sci-fi comic series Ace Trucking Co., the supporting character 'GBH' is convinced he died several years before the events of the series. His uniform's name badge, accordingly, reads GBH (DEAD).

== See also ==
- Angor animi - Symptom where patients believe they are dying
- Depersonalization derealization disorder – Mental dissociative disorder
- Fregoli delusion – Mental disorder
- Mirrored-self misidentification – Delusional belief that one's reflection in the mirror is another person
- Mortality salience – Awareness about death
- Prosopagnosia – Cognitive disorder of face perception
- Zombie – Undead being from Haitian folklore and horror fiction
