= Intermetamorphosis =

- Specialty: Psychiatry

Intermetamorphosis is a delusional misidentification syndrome, related to agnosia. The main symptoms consist of patients believing that they can see others change into someone else in both external appearance and internal personality. The disorder is usually comorbid with neurological disorders or mental disorders. The disorder was first described in 1932 by Paul Courbon (1879–1958), a French psychiatrist. Intermetamorphosis is rare, although issues with diagnostics and comorbidity may lead to under-reporting.

== Signs and symptoms ==
Individuals experiencing intermetamorphosis, as well as the other delusional misidentification syndromes (DMS), tend to misidentify those people that are both physically and emotionally close to them; the most commonly misidentified people are parents, siblings and spouses. There are instances of individuals misidentifying people not known to them; however, they still held an affective importance, such as celebrities or politicians. The explanations for the inauthenticity of the misidentified people are associated with the individual experiencing the delusions' cultural background.

=== Example ===
An example from medical literature is a man who was diagnosed with Alzheimer's disease. He mistook his wife for his deceased mother and later for his sister. He explained that he had never been married or that his wife had left him. Later he mistook his son for his brother and his daughter for another sister. Visual agnosia or prosopagnosia were not diagnosed, as the misidentification also took place during phone calls. On several occasions he mistook the hospital for the church he used to go to.

=== Violence ===
There is an association in the literature between misidentification syndromes and violent or aggressive behavior. In several case studies, individuals with misidentification syndromes acted aggressively towards the object of misidentification, which has the potential for criminal behavior. This may be because the delusions cause individuals to view the misidentified object with suspicion, and they become paranoid about the inauthenticity of the object, leading to an act of presumed preemptive self-defense. Although gender differences in the occurrence of intermetamorphosis are not pronounced, the research demonstrates that a majority (70%) of occurrences with violent behavior involves males. The issue of violent and aggressive behavior within this set of syndromes continues to play an important role in the discussion of criminal responsibility and risk assessment.

=== Comorbidity ===
Intermetamorphosis and other DMSs often occur together or interchange. DMSs are also often comorbid with psychiatric disorders, such as schizophrenia, schizoaffective disorder, bipolar disorder, and PTSD. Paranoid schizophrenia is most commonly associated with DMSs. They are also associated with neurological conditions or diseases, including dementia, Alzheimer's disease and alcohol- or drug-induced cognitive impairment. Among comorbid symptoms, paranoid psychotic symptoms, depressive psychotic symptoms and auditory hallucinations are the most often present.

== Cause ==
Explanations for the occurrence of intermetamorphosis were first given by psychodynamic theorists. These theories typically involve a psychotic resolution towards an individual's feelings of intense ambivalence about the misidentified object. These theories may also involve the egos and identity-forming, as well as defense mechanisms involving splitting the negative and positive aspects of the self. Despite their initial popularity, there is not much empirical support for these psychodynamic explanations.

Recent advancements in neuroimaging and structural studies have provided evidence of an organic etiology. Neurological dysfunction and neuropsychiatric abnormalities, in various forms, are now believed to be a central feature in DMSs. Neuropsychological findings suggest that symptoms are produced in some aspect by brain dysfunction or damage, specifically in the right hemisphere. Lesions in the right frontal lobe and adjacent areas have been found through neuroimaging in case reports of intermetamorphosis. In studying over 20 patients with misidentification syndromes, Christodoulou found electroencephalographic abnormalities in over 90%. In one case of intermetamorphosis, Joseph reported electroencephalographic abnormalities with right temporo-parietal predominance. Impaired connectivity or dysconnectivity between the right fusiform and right parahippocampal areas and the frontal lobes and the right temporolimbic regions have also been seen in case reports of this syndrome, which are thought to be implicated in deficits in face recognition, visual memory recall, and identification processes. While impairments in facial processing are experienced by most DMSs, it appears to be experienced more consciously in intermetamorphosis than in other DMSs. Cortical atrophy is also sometimes present, although this may be due to co-occurring dementia and other organic mental syndromes. Overactivity in the perirhinal cortex appears to be associated with the loss of familiarity in intermetamorphosis. Depersonalization has also been postulated as a contributing factor to the development of intermetamorphosis; under conditions like the presence of a paranoid element, a charged emotional relationship to the principal misidentified person, and cerebral dysfunction, depersonalization and derealization symptoms may develop into a full delusional misidentification syndrome.

== Diagnosis ==
How to define intermetamorphosis and other delusional misidentification syndromes is frequently debated in the literature. Some believe that misidentification is a symptom, and that the overlapping nature of these syndromes suggests that they are "states" associated with other psychiatric or neurological disorders, but that they're not diagnostic in themselves. As their name suggests, many professionals consider them syndromes, because misidentification appears to occur more often in association with certain symptoms, like depersonalization, derealization, and paranoia. Lastly, some believe that they should be discrete diagnoses in the Diagnostic and Statistical Manual of Mental Disorders.

== Treatment ==
Results regarding the efficacy of treatments for intermetamorphosis are mixed. Treatment of any co-occurring mental disorder or substance abuse is necessary. There have been no controlled studies about pharmacological treatments of intermetamorphosis. However, both atypical and typical antipsychotics are often used, and have been found to be effective in patients with both organic and functional disorders. Some that have been effective in case studies are clozapine, olanzapine, risperidone, quetiapine, sulpiride, trifluoperazine, pimozide, haloperidol and carbamazepine. Clorazepate, a benzodiazepine used in the treatment of anxiety and seizure disorders, has also been used effectively. Occasionally, antidepressants and lithium have been used, especially in the instance of a co-occurring mood or bipolar disorder.

== Reverse Intermetamorphosis ==
A proposed variant of intermetamorphosis is the syndrome of "reverse" intermetamorphosis, in which there is the delusional belief that an individual is undergoing radical changes in both physical and psychological identities.
