= Astral projection =

Interpretation of out-of-body experiences

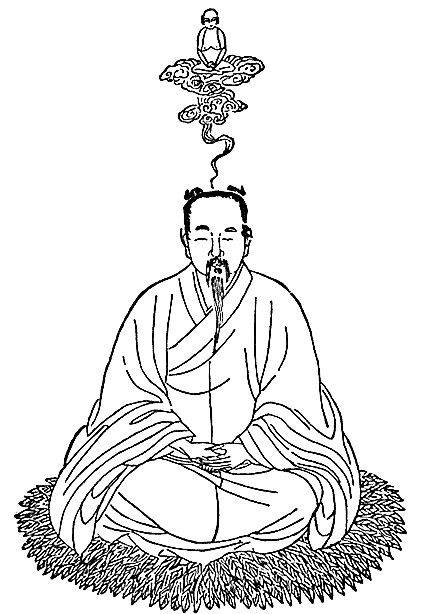
"The Separation of the Spirit Body" from The Secret of the Golden Flower, a Chinese handbook on alchemy and meditation

In esotericism, astral projection (also known as astral travel, soul journey, soul wandering, spiritual journey, spiritual travel) is an intentional out-of-body experience (OBE) in which a subtle body, known as the astral body or body of light where consciousness functions separately through from the physical body, travels throughout the astral plane.

The idea of astral travel is ancient and occurs in multiple cultures. The term "astral projection" was coined and promoted by 19th-century Theosophists. It is sometimes associated with dreams and forms of meditation. Some individuals have reported perceptions similar to descriptions of astral projection that were induced through various hallucinogenic and hypnotic means (including self-hypnosis). There is no scientific evidence that there is a consciousness whose embodied functions are separate from normal neural activity, or that one can consciously leave the body and make observations of the physical universe. As a result, astral projection has been characterized as pseudoscience.

== Accounts ==
=== Ancient Egyptian ===
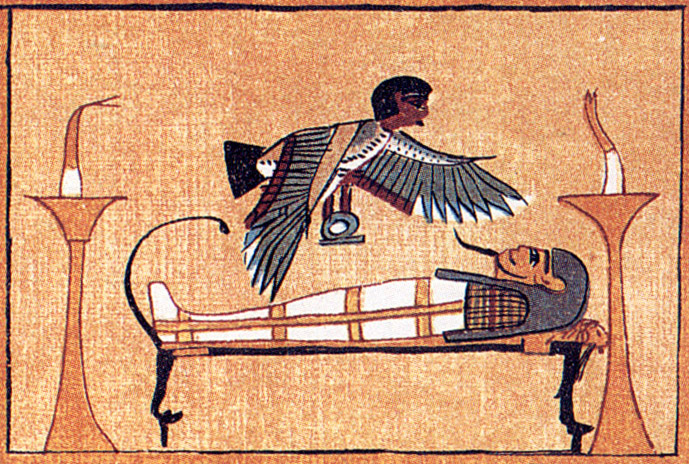
The ba hovering above the body. This image is based on an original found in The Book of the Dead.

Similar concepts of soul travel appear in various other religious traditions. For example, ancient Egyptian teachings present the soul (ba) as having the ability to hover outside the physical body via the ka, or subtle body.

=== Amazon ===
The yaskomo of the Waiwai is believed to have the ability to perform a soul flight that can serve several functions, such as healing; flying to the sky to consult cosmological beings (the Moon or the Brother of the Moon) to obtain a name for a newborn baby; flying to the cave of peccaries' mountains to ask the father of peccaries for abundance of game; or flying deep down into a river to seek the aid of other beings.

=== Inuit ===
In some Inuit groups, individuals with special capabilities, known as angakkuq, are said to be able to travel to (mythological) remote places, and report their experiences and important matters back to their community. Those abilities would be unavailable to individuals with normal capabilities. Among other things, an angakkuq was said to have the ability to stop bad hunting luck or heal a sick person. Soul wandering is classified as a culture-specific disorder.

=== Hindu ===
Similar ideas such as the Liṅga Śarīra are found in ancient Hindu scriptures such as the Yogavashishta-Maharamayana of Valmiki. Modern Indians who have vouched for astral projection include Paramahansa Yogananda who witnessed Swami Pranabananda doing a miracle through a possible astral projection.

The Indian spiritual teacher Meher Baba described one's use of astral projection:

In the advancing stages leading to the beginning of the path, the aspirant becomes spiritually prepared for being entrusted with free use of the forces of the inner world of the astral bodies. He may then undertake astral journeys in his astral body, leaving the physical body in sleep or wakefulness. The astral journeys that are taken unconsciously are much less important than those undertaken with full consciousness and as a result of deliberate volition. This implies conscious use of the astral body. Conscious separation of the astral body from the outer vehicle of the gross body has its own value in making the soul feel its distinction from the gross body and in arriving at fuller control of the gross body. One can, at will, put on and take off the external gross body as if it were a cloak and use the astral body for experiencing the inner world of the astral and for undertaking journeys through it, if and when necessary. ... The ability to undertake astral journeys therefore involves considerable expansion of one's scope for experience. It brings opportunities for promoting one's own spiritual advancement, which begins with the involution of consciousness.

Astral projection is one of the siddhis ('magical powers') considered achievable by yoga practitioners through self-disciplined practice. In the epic Mahabharata, Drona leaves his physical body to see if his son is alive.

In Autobiography of a Yogi (1946), Paramahansa Yogananda recounts several experiences that he interpreted as evidence of powers involving subtle bodies. He describes an encounter with his deceased teacher, Sri Yukteswar, who appears to him after his death and explains the nature of the astral and causal worlds, including the existence of astral bodies distinct from the physical body.

=== Japanese ===
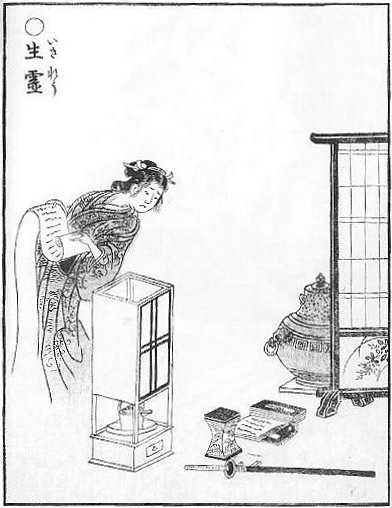
The ikiryō as illustrated by Toriyama Sekien

In Japanese mythology, an ikiryō (生霊; also read as shōryō, seirei, or ikisudama) is a manifestation of the soul of a living person separately from their body. Traditionally, if someone holds a sufficient grudge against another person, it is believed that a part or the whole of their soul can temporarily leave their body and appear before the target of their hate in order to curse or otherwise harm them, similar to an evil eye. Souls are also believed to leave a living body when the body is extremely sick or comatose; but such ikiryō are not malevolent.

=== Taoist ===
Taoist alchemical practice involves creation of an energy body by breathing meditations, drawing energy into a 'pearl' that is then circulated.

Xiangzi ... with a drum as his pillow fell fast asleep, snoring and motionless. His primordial spirit, however, went straight into the banquet room and said, "My lords, here I am again." When Tuizhi walked with the officials to take a look, there really was a Taoist sleeping on the ground and snoring like thunder. Yet inside, in the side room, there was another Taoist beating a fisher drum and singing Taoist songs. The officials all said, "Although there are two different people, their faces and clothes are exactly alike. Clearly he is a divine immortal who can divide his body and appear in several places at once. ..." At that moment, the Taoist in the side room came walking out, and the Taoist sleeping on the ground woke up. The two merged into one.

=== Judaic and Christian ===
Carrington, Muldoon, Peterson, and Williams say that the subtle body is attached to the physical body by means of a psychic silver cord. Ecclesiastes 12:6 is often cited in this respect: "Remember him—before the silver cord is severed, and the golden bowl is broken; before the pitcher is shattered at the spring, and the wheel broken at the well". Rabbi Nosson Scherman, however, contends that the context points to this being merely a metaphor, comparing the body to a machine, with the silver cord referring to the spine.

James Hankins argues that 2 Corinthians 12:2, "I know a man in Christ who fourteen years ago was caught up to the third heaven. Whether it was in the body or out of the body I do not know—God knows", refers to the astral planes.

=== Western esotericism ===
According to the classical, medieval, renaissance Hermeticism, Neoplatonism, and later Theosophist and Rosicrucian thought, the 'astral body' is an intermediate body of light linking the rational soul to the physical body while the astral plane is an intermediate world of light between Heaven and Earth, composed of the spheres of the planets and stars. These astral spheres were held to be populated by angels, demons, and spirits.

In the Neoplatonism of Plotinus, for example, the individual is a microcosm ("small world") of the universe (the macrocosm or "great world"). "The rational soul...is akin to the great Soul of the World" while "the material universe, like the body, is made as a faded image of the Intelligible". Each succeeding plane of manifestation is causal to the next, a world-view known as emanationism; "from the One proceeds Intellect, from Intellect Soul, and from Soul—in its lower phase, or that of Nature—the material universe". The idea of the astral figured prominently in the work of the nineteenth-century French occultist Eliphas Levi, whence it was adopted and developed further by Theosophy, and used afterwards by other esoteric movements.

The subtle bodies, and their associated planes of existence, form an essential part of some esoteric systems that deal with astral phenomena. Often these bodies and their planes of existence are depicted as a series of concentric circles or nested spheres, with a separate body traversing each realm.

== Terminology ==
The expression "astral projection" came to be used in two different ways. For the Hermetic Order of the Golden Dawn and some Theosophists, it retained the classical and medieval philosophers' meaning of journeying to other worlds, heavens, hells, the astrological spheres and other landscapes in the body of light; but outside these circles the term was increasingly applied to non-physical travel around the physical world.

Though this usage continues to be widespread, the term, "etheric travel", used by some later Theosophists, offers a useful distinction. Some experimenters say they visit different times and/or places: etheric, then, is used to represent the sense of being out of the body in the physical world; whereas astral may connote some alteration in time-perception. Robert Monroe describes the former type of projection as "Locale I" or the "Here-Now", involving people and places that exist: Robert Bruce calls it the "Real Time Zone" (RTZ) and describes it as the non-physical dimension-level closest to the physical. This etheric body is usually, though not always, invisible but is often perceived by the experient as connected to the physical body during separation by a silver cord. Some link falling dreams with projection.

According to Max Heindel, the etheric double serves as a medium between the astral and physical realms. In his system the ether, also called prana, is the vital force that empowers the physical forms to change. From his descriptions it can be inferred that, to him, when one views the physical during an out-of-body experience, one is not technically in the astral realm at all.

Other experiments may describe a domain that has no parallel to any known physical setting. Environments may be populated or unpopulated, artificial, natural or abstract, and the experience may be beatific, horrific or neutral. A common Theosophical belief is that one may access a compendium of mystical knowledge called the Akashic records. In many accounts the experiencer correlates the astral world with the world of dreams. Some even report seeing other dreamers enacting dream scenarios unaware of their wider environment.

The astral environment may also be divided into levels or sub-planes by theorists, but there are many different views in various traditions concerning the overall structure of the astral planes: they may include heavens and hells and other after-death spheres, transcendent environments, or other less-easily characterized states.

== Scientific reception ==
There is no known scientific evidence that astral projection as an objective phenomenon exists, although there are cases of patients having experiences suggestive of astral projection from brain stimulation treatments and hallucinogenic drugs, such as ketamine, phencyclidine (PCP), and dimethyltryptamine (DMT). Subjects in parapsychological experiments have attempted to project their astral bodies to distant rooms and see what was happening. However, such experiments have not produced clear results.

Psychologist Donovan Rawcliffe wrote that astral projection can be explained by delusion, hallucination, and vivid dreams. Arthur W. Wiggins wrote that purported evidence of the ability to astrally travel great distances and give descriptions of places visited is predominantly anecdotal and considers astral travel an illusion. He looks to neuroanatomy, prior knowledge, and human belief and imagination to provide prosaic explanations for those who experience it. Robert Todd Carroll writes that the main evidence to support claims of astral travel is anecdotal and comes "in the form of testimonials of those who claim to have experienced being out of their bodies when they may have been out of their minds."

== Notable practitioners ==
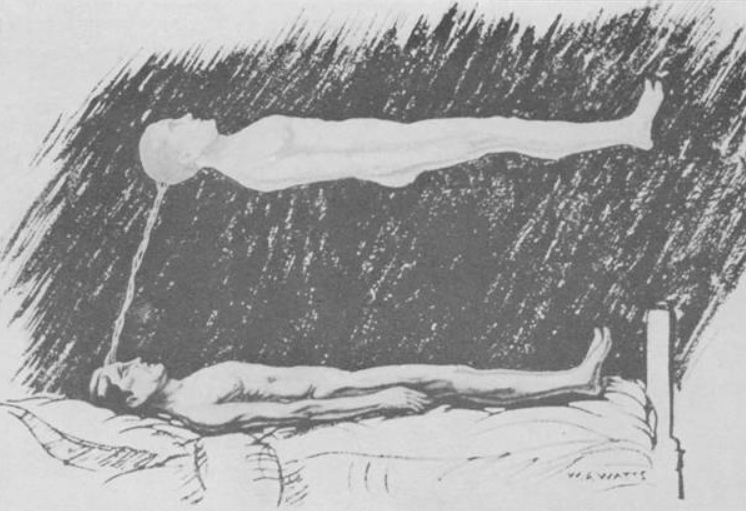
Astral projection according to Carrington and Muldoon, 1929

Emanuel Swedenborg was one of the first practitioners to write extensively about the out-of-body experience, in his Spiritual Diary (1747–1765). In her book, My Religion, Helen Keller tells of her beliefs in Swedenborgianism and how she once traveled astrally to Athens:

I have been far away all this time, and I haven't left the room...It was clear to me that it was because I was a spirit that I had so vividly 'seen' and felt a place a thousand miles away. Space was nothing to spirit!

In occult traditions, practices range from inducing trance states to the mental construction of a second body, called the "body of light" by Aleister Crowley (1875–1947), through visualization and controlled breathing, followed by the transfer of consciousness to the secondary body by a mental act of will.

There are many 20th-century publications on astral projection, although only a few writers continue to be cited. These include Edgar Cayce (1877–1945), Hereward Carrington (1880–1958), Oliver Fox (1885–1949), Sylvan Muldoon (1903–1969), and Robert Monroe (1915–1995).

Robert Monroe's accounts of journeys to other realms (1971–1994) popularized the term "OBE" and were translated into a large number of languages. Though his books themselves only placed secondary importance on descriptions of method, Monroe also founded an institute dedicated to research, exploration and non-profit dissemination of auditory technology for assisting others in achieving projection and related altered states of consciousness.

Carlos Castaneda (1925–1998) discusses his teacher Don Juan's beliefs about "the double" and its abilities in his books Tales of Power (1974), The Second Ring of Power (1977), and The Art of Dreaming (1993). Florinda Donner, a student of Castaneda, further describes methods of using the double to access the physical world while dreaming and access the dream world while in a waking dream state in her 1992 book, Being-in-Dreaming.

Michael Crichton (1942–2008) gives lengthy and detailed explanations and experience of astral projection in his 1988 non-fiction book Travels. Robert Bruce, William Buhlman, Marilynn Hughes, and Albert Taylor have discussed their theories and findings on the syndicated show Coast to Coast AM several times.

== See also ==
- Astral body – Concept of a subtle body, intermediate between the soul and body
- Astral plane – Concept of a world of celestial spheres
- Bilocation – Alleged supernatural ability to be in two places at once
- Dream yoga – Tibetan meditation practice
- Eckankar – Religious movement founded in 1965 by Paul Twitchell
- Energy being – Alleged life form composed of energy rather than matter
- Etheric body – Concept in neo-Theosophy
- Hypnagogia – State of consciousness leading into sleep
- Illusory body – Tibetan Buddhist practice
- Inner space (science fiction) – Antonym to "outer space"
- Kundalini – Form of divine energy in Hindu mysticism
- Lucid dream – Dream where one is aware that one is dreaming
- Luminous mind – Term used in Buddhist doctrine
- Mental body – Concept in theosophy and other philosophies
- Mental world – Ontological category in metaphysics
- Merkabah mysticism – School of early Jewish mysticism
- Metempsychosis – Transmigration of the soul
- Mindstream – Buddhist concept of continuity of mind
- Psyche (psychology) – Totality of the human mind, conscious and unconscious
- Rainbow body – Level of realization within Tibetan Buddhism
- Remote viewing – Pseudoscientific concept
- Scrying – Seeking visions in a reflective surface
- Simulated reality – Concept of a false version of reality
- Sleep paralysis – Sleeping disorder
- Soul flight – Shamanic practice
- Stream of consciousness (psychology) – Thoughts flowing through the conscious mind
- Subtle body – Quasi material aspect of the human body
- Tattva vision – Subject related to ESP
- Teleportation – Science fiction transportation concept
- Worship of heavenly bodies – Worship of stars and other heavenly bodies as deities
- Yoga nidra – State of consciousness between waking and sleeping
