= Dream yoga =

Tibetan meditation practice

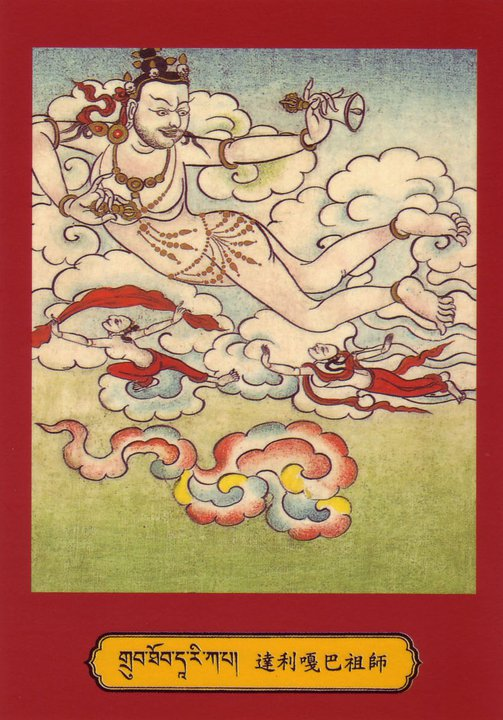
Darikapa, 9th-century Buddhist mahasiddha. After achieving the ability to lucid dream, a common first stage is attempting to fly in the dream.

Dream yoga or milam (Tibetan: རྨི་ལམ་རྣལ་འབྱོར་, Wylie: rmi lam rnal 'byor, THL: milam naljor; Sanskrit: स्वप्नदर्शनयोग, svapnadarśanayoga) (Note: Svarpnadarshana may be parsed into svarpna and darshana.)—the Yoga of the Dream State—is a suite of advanced tantric sadhana of the entwined Mantrayana lineages of Dzogchen (Nyingmapa, Ngagpa, Mahasiddha, Kagyu and Bönpo). Dream yoga consists of tantric processes and techniques within the trance Bardos of Dream and Sleep (Standard Tibetan: mi-lam bardo) Six Dharmas of Naropa.

The 'dream body' and the 'bardo body' have been identified with the 'vision body' (Tibetan: yid lus):

In the bardo one has...the yilü (Wylie: yid lus), the vision body (yid, consciousness; lus, body). It is the same as the body of dreams, the mind body.

In the yoga of dreaming (rmi lam, *svapna), the yogi learns to remain aware during the states of dreaming (i.e. to lucid dream) and uses this skill to practice yoga in the dream.

== Bon ==
Mi-lam, also known as dream yoga in the Tibetan tradition, is a method for remaining aware during the dream state in order to realize the emptiness of dreams and apply this realization to both dreams and waking life. In Bön, dream yoga is part of Dzogchen teaching, which stresses the clear light nature of the mind, while inducing lucid dreaming and conscious transcending of dream imagery.

== Nyingma lineage ==
The Nyingma lineage holds that there are 'Seven transmissions' (Tibetan: bka' babs bdun), or 'sacred streams of blessing and empowerment' (Tibetan: dam pa'i byin rlabs) that may iterate the mindstream of a tantrika. Transmission is a communion of mindstreams though at the substratum there is a mindstream 'singularity' or 'oneness' (Wylie: gcig). Though the fortuitous emergence of these seven modalities or channels of transmission may occur in the waking state if the time, space, circumstance and karmic connection is opportune; they may similarly be initiated in a lucid, dream yoga state. One transmission type particularly emphasized in relation to dream yoga, symbolism and iconography, and trance states, is that of 'pure vision' (Tibetan: dag snang) and the perception of Sambhogakaya thoughtforms and yidam simulacrum.

The Nyingma tradition views itself as the fruit of three streams of transmission, one of which is the 'pure vision' which includes dream yoga and trance visions within its auspice:

- the 'remote' canonical lineage, transmitted by an uninterrupted line of humans;
- the 'close' lineage of hidden spiritual treasures; and
- the 'profound' lineage of pure vision.

== Kagyu lineage ==
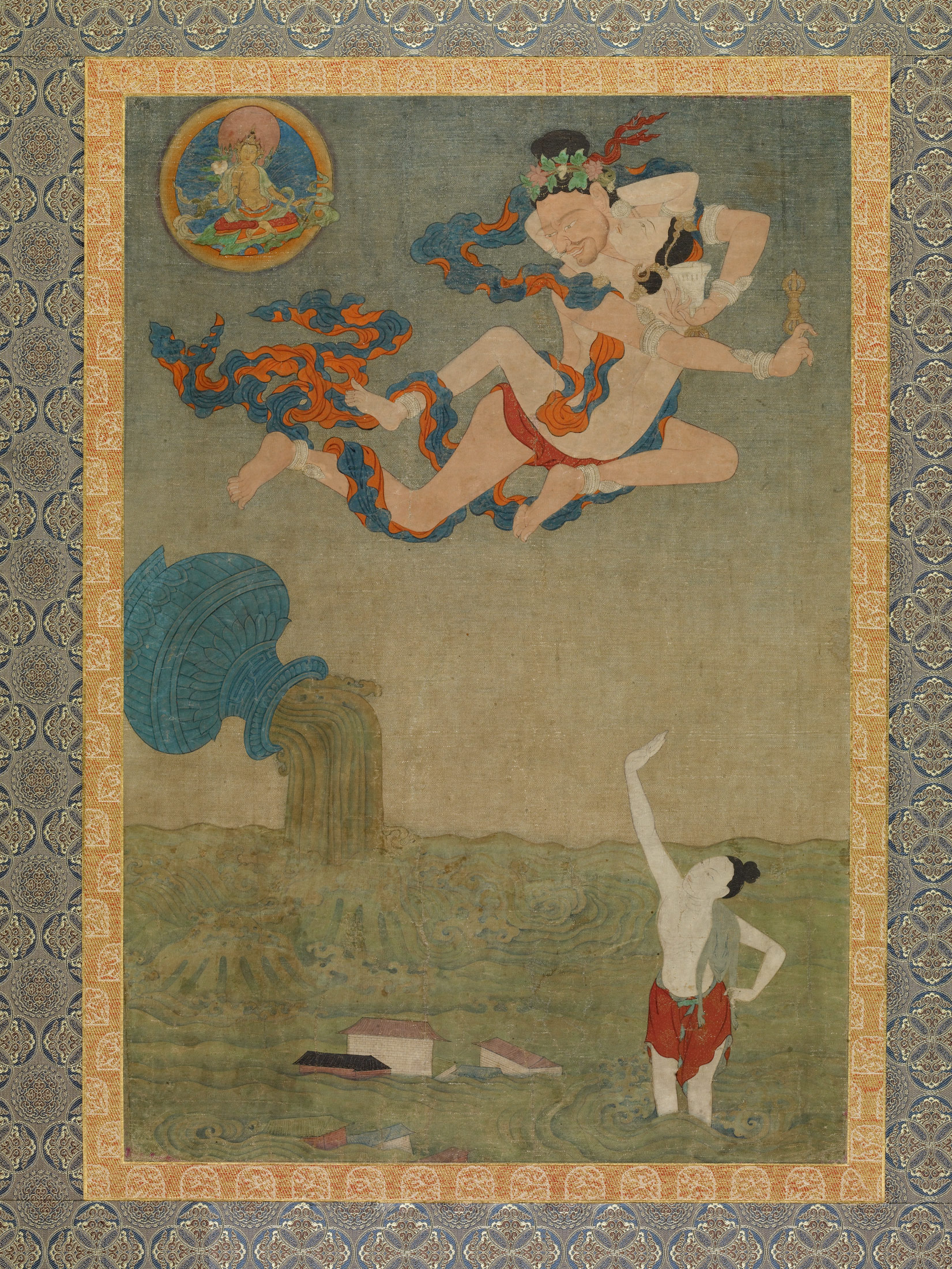
Mahasiddha Ghantapa, from Situ Panchen's set of thangka depicting the Eight Great Tantric Adepts. 18th century.

In the Kagyu 'Lineage of the Four Commissioners' (Tibetan: Ka-bab-shi-gyu-pa), the lineage stream of dream yoga is identified as originating from the Dharmakaya Buddha Vajradhara. The Dharmakaya, synonymous with Vajradhara Buddha, is the source of all the manifestations of enlightenment. From Caryapa, Tilopa (988 – 1069 CE) of the Dzogchen Kham lineage, "received the oral instructions on Dream yoga according to the method of the Mahamaya-tantra." From Nagarjuna (c. 150 – 250 CE), Tilopa received the radiant light (Sanskrit: prabhasvara) and Illusory Body (Sanskrit: maya deha) teachings. The illusory body, clear light, and dream yoga sadhanas are entwined.

Tilopa's oral instructions state:

Know dreams as dreams, and constantly meditate on their profound significance. Visualize the seed syllables of the five natures with the drop, the nada and so forth. One perceives buddhas and buddhafields. The time of sleep is the time for the method that brings realization of great bliss. This is the instruction of Lawapa.

=== Gampopa's presentation ===
Gampopa's Closely Stringed Pearls outlines four main sequential steps:

- Seizing the dream – Becoming lucid in the dream. First, the yogi must see all perceptions and thoughts as a dream during the day. Then, they must go to sleep lying on their right side, with strong determination to recognize they are dreaming within the dream. They visualize a lotus flower with five syllables that radiate gentle light in the throat chakra and slowly shift their awareness from one syllable to another while falling asleep. This should spontaneously produce the experience of lucid dreaming. In another meditation manual by Gampopa, A Mirror Illuminating the Oral Transmission, one is instructed to visualize a sphere of light in between the eyebrows instead.
- Training – According to Kragh, "The yogi is here instructed to think of whatever dream arises as being merely a dream and to relate to it without any fear. If he dreams of water, he should plunge into it or walk across it. He should jump into an abyss or sit down to be bitten by dream-dogs or beaten by dream enemies. He should fly in air, visit the god realms, or go sight-seeing in India."
- Blessing as illusory and getting rid of fear – Here, the yogi checks their mind during the dream to see if there is even the slightest fear, and if so, they should let go of it by recognizing that they are only in a dream. Once they've mastered the feeling of complete unobstructedness, they have "blessed their dreams as illusory" (sgyu ma byin gyis brlabs pa).
- Meditating on reality – The yogi meditates on reality by "analyzing that all states of dream consciousness are his own mind, which is unborn (rang gi sems skye ba med pa). If such a contemplation of Mahamudra did not occur during the night, the yogi should direct his focus on the syllables again in the morning after waking up and then rest in the state of Mahamudra."

Another meditation manual by Gampopa also explains how the yogi should attempt to see Buddhas and dakinis giving them teachings in their dreams, and how this gives rise to blessing. It also recommends to practice kumbhaka breathing before sleep.

== Gelug lineage ==
In Tsongkhapa's system, it is necessary to become acquainted with the tummo, radiance/clear light and illusory body practices before practicing dream yoga (which he sees as an extension of illusory body yoga). According to Tsongkhapa, before practicing dream yoga, one must first master the yoga of retaining the radiance/clear light that arises at the moment of falling asleep (through experiencing the visions etc.) as explained above. If one practices this before sleep, when a dream occurs, one will realize that one is in a dream.

Dream yoga in Tsongkhapa's system consists of four trainings: "learning to retain [conscious presence during] dreams; controlling and increasing dreams; overcoming fear and training in the illusory nature of dreams; and meditating upon the suchness of dreams."

Dream yoga practice begins by first acquiring the skill to recognize one is dreaming within the dream. If one is not successful in recognizing one's dream through the practice of retaining the radiance of sleep, "one should cultivate a strong resolution to retain conscious awareness in the dream state. In addition, one meditates on the chakras, especially that at the throat." If one can make this resolution to recognize one's dream strong and continuous throughout the day, one will be able to recognize one's dream. One can also practice the visualization meditations on the throat and forehead chakras during the day so as to enhance one's ability at night. One may also meditate upon oneself as the deity, and on guru yoga, offering prayers so that one may experience clear dreams.

Tsongkhapa mentions various meditations to be done before falling asleep. In the first one, one generates a vision of oneself as the deity as well as a vision of one's guru, and prays to the guru to recognize the dream and so forth. Then one visualizes a small red four petaled lotus in the throat chakra, with an Ah or Om in the center. He mentions that in another tradition, it is taught that one meditates on five syllables (OM, AH, NU, TA, RA), with one at the center and the other four around it. One focuses on each of these in succession. The second method is to pray as before, and meditate on a white radiant drop the size of a mustard seed between the eyebrows. Then one performs vase breath seven times and goes to sleep.

One can also meditate on the heart chakra before sleep. According to Tsongkhapa, if one finds it too difficult to recognize one is dreaming, then this means one is a deep sleeper, and thus one should switch to the crown chakra. This will lighten one's sleep. If this makes sleep difficult however, then one can focus on the chakra at the tip of the penis and unites the vital winds there 21 times through kumbhaka.

Once one has recognized the dream, one can begin to learn to control it. One first practices controlling basic elements such as flying, going to the heavens, traveling to buddhafields etc. One can also train in "increasing", i..e multiplying dream objects, including one's body, into numerous duplicates. The practice of controlling the vital winds will enhance one's ability to control the dream.

The next step is training in becoming fearless by doing anything that might kill a person in the non-dream world, such as jumping into water or fire. One can use this to meditate on the empty nature of dreams and to recognize their illusory nature.

Finally, one meditates on suchness in the dream. One visualizes oneself as the deity, with a HUM at the heart, radiating light everywhere. This light melts everything in the dream into light, which is drawn into the HUM. One's body also melts and is drawn into the HUM. Then the HUM dissolves into radiance/clear light, and one rests in the state of radiance.

== Exegesis ==
Walter Evans-Wentz describes Tibetan dream yoga in his book Tibetan Yoga and Secret Doctrines as one of the six subtypes of yoga elaborated by the Tibetan guru Marpa and passed down by his disciple Milarepa. The author describes six stages of dream yoga. In the first stage, the dreamer is told to become lucid in the dream. In the second stage, the dreamer is instructed to overcome all fear of the contents of the dream so there is the realization that nothing in the dream can cause harm. For instance, the lucid dreamer should put out the fire with his hands and realize fire cannot burn him in the dream. Next, the dreamer should contemplate how all phenomena both in the dream and in waking life are similar because they change, and that life is illusory in both states because of this constant change. Both the objects in the dream and objects in the world in the Buddhist worldview are therefore empty and have no substantial nature. This is the stage of contemplating the dream as maya, and equating this sense of maya with everyday experience in the external world. Next, the dreamer should realize that they have control of the dream by changing big objects into small ones, heavy objects into light ones, and many objects into one object.

After gaining control over objects and their transformations, in the fifth stage, the dreamer should realize that the dreamer's dream body is as insubstantial as the other objects in the dream. The dreamer should realize that they are not the dream body. The dreamer who has gained complete control over dream objects could, for instance, alter the body's shape or make the dream body disappear altogether. Finally, in the sixth stage, the images of deities (Buddhas, Bodhisattvas, or Dakinis) should be visualized in the lucid dream state. These figures are frequently seen in Tibetan religious art (thangkas) and used in meditation. They are said to be linked to or resonate with the clear light of the Void. They can, therefore, serve as symbolic doorways to this mystical state of being (the Void or clear light). The dreamer is instructed to concentrate on these symbolic images without distraction or thinking about other things so that the revelatory side of these symbols will become manifest.

Yuthok states that:

...if we do sadhanas regularly and faithfully we will begin to dream about doing them. In the same way, if we practise an illusory body we will begin to dream about it, too. There is a great correspondence between dream yoga and the illusory body. The more we think of an illusory body, the more dreams we will have. We will see them as dreams, rather than mistaking them for real life. We can do many things in dreams which we are unable to do while awake.

and adds that:

People who have practised dream yoga have been able to visit teachers they missed and travel to lands they never managed to get to in the waking state. The dream state is a very pure state of mind.

Namkhai Norbu advises that the realization that life is only a big dream can help liberate from the chains of emotions, attachments, and ego, opening up the possibility of ultimately becoming enlightened.

== See also ==
- The Art of Dreaming
- Astral projection
- Body of light
- Carlos Castaneda
- Florinda Donner
- The Dreaming
- Dreamwork
- Lucid dream
- Process-oriented psychology
- Rainbow body
- Reality in Buddhism
- Yoga nidra
