= Robert Monroe =

American radio broadcaster and writer

Robert A. Monroe
- Born: Robert Allan Monroe; October 30, 1915; Indiana, United States
- Died: March 17, 1995 (aged 79)
- Education: Ohio State University (B.A.)
- Occupations: Radio broadcaster Researcher; Writer
- Organization(s): Monroe Products and The Monroe Institute (founder), Jefferson Cable Corporation (founder)
- Notable work: Journeys Out of the Body (1971), Far Journeys (1985), Ultimate Journey (1994)
- Website: www.monroeinstitute.org

Robert Allan Monroe, also known as Bob Monroe (October 30, 1915 – March 17, 1995), was an American radio broadcasting executive who became known for his books on his out-of-body experiences (OBEs) and for founding The Monroe Institute, which researches consciousness and produces the Gateway Program to teach people how to go out of body.

His 1971 book Journeys Out of the Body is credited with popularizing the term "out-of-body experience" (OBE) and for introducing the ability to self-induce OBEs—a practice previously called astral projection—to a large audience. It has sold around a million copies.

Monroe's institute developed Hemi-Sync, short for hemispheric synchronization, based on a finding from 1839 that when the brain heard two frequencies, it produced a third that made up the difference between the two. For example, 170 Hz in one ear and 174 Hz in another ear results in the brain producing 4 Hz waves—theta waves. Hemi-Sync was used to generate brainwaves conducive to attaining various nonordinary states of consciousness, including ones helpful for going out of body. These formed the basis of the Monroe Institute's Gateway, Guidelines, Lifeline, and other audio tapes.

He was one of the founders of the Jefferson Cable Corporation, the first cable company to cover central Virginia.

== Biography ==
Robert Allan Monroe was born in 1915 in Indiana and grew up in Lexington, Kentucky, and Columbus, Ohio. His mother was a non-practicing medical doctor, cellist, and piano player. His father was a professor of Romance Languages who led summer tours to Europe.

According to his third book Ultimate Journey, he dropped out of Ohio State University in his sophomore year due to a hospital stay for a facial burn that caused him to fall behind in his studies. During almost a year away from college, he tried to find work. He returned to Ohio State to graduate after having studied pre-med, English, engineering and journalism.

He married Jeanette, a graduate student and daughter of a lawyer, in 1937, and divorced her in 1938 or 1939. He married Mary Ashworth, a divorcee with a daughter Maria, in 1950 or 1951. They had Bob's only biological child together, daughter Laurie. They divorced in 1968. He then married Nancy Penn Honeycutt, a divorcee with four children. They remained married until her death from breast cancer on August 15, 1992.

Monroe developed ulcers in young adulthood and so was classified 4F (unfit for service) during World War II. He spent the war years working for a manufacturing company that designed a flight-simulator prototype. He wrote for an aviation column in Argosy magazine and was given a job with the National Aeronautic Association (NAA), for whom he produced a weekly radio show called "Scramble!", the primary purpose of which was to interest youth in aviation.

In 1953, Monroe formed RAM Enterprises, a corporation that produced network radio programs, as many as 28 programs monthly, principally in dramatic and popular quiz shows.

In 1956, the firm created a Research and Development division to study the effects of various sound patterns on human consciousness, including the sleep state. Monroe was especially attracted to the concept of sleep-learning. This was a natural direction to take, applying to this new area the audio production methods used in the firm's commercial activity. The purpose was to find more constructive uses for such knowledge than was ordinarily available, and the results of this research have become internationally known.

== Out-of-body experiences ==
According to his own account, told in Journeys Out of the Body, in 1958, Monroe began to experience sensations of paralysis and vibration, in some cases accompanied by a bright light that appeared to be shining on him from a shallow angle. Monroe went on to say that this occurred another nine times over the next six weeks—without the light—culminating in his first out-of-body experience (OBE). At first, he did not know what this was about. He feared he had a mental illness. His physician said he might be working too hard. A psychologist friend told him he was performing "astral projection." Later, Monroe found what he called "the psychic underground, where he found more information about astral projection, reading books by Oliver Fox, Sylvan Muldoon, and others.

Monroe recorded his account of his out of body experiences in his 1971 book Journeys Out of the Body and went on to become a prominent researcher in the field of human consciousness. Monroe later authored two more books on his OBEs, Far Journeys (1985) and Ultimate Journey (1994), describing visiting a nonphysical reality, interacting with nonphysical entities, and eventually connecting with his "I-There," his term for what most people would call the soul. In his books, he deliberately avoided pre-existing spiritual terms, including astral projection.

== The Park ==
In Monroe's first and last books, he writes about visiting the Park, the hub of what he called the Reception Center, where spirits go after dying to rest and recuperate. This place, the Park, appears in the accounts of near-death experiencers, such as Elizabeth Krohn, as described in her book Changed in a Flash (2018).

== Loosh and other neologisms ==
Monroe avoided spiritual or religious terms in his books, and thus coined many terms and acronyms. "Loosh" was a term Monroe coined to describe a type of "energy" created by humans and other living beings experiencing intense fear, grief, despair, or love, which non-human beings harvest. Monroe learned of it through a ROTE (see below).

ROTE was short for Related Organized Thought Energy. Time-space illusion was the universe. Belief System Territories were the nonphysical realms where people with strong beliefs went after dying to be with others that share the same beliefs. Reception Center was a way-station where the newly dead went.

== The Monroe Institute ==
In 1962 RAM enterprises moved to Virginia, and a few years later changed the corporate name to Monroe Industries. In this location it became active in radio station ownership, cable television, and later in the production and sale of audio cassettes. These cassettes were practical expressions of the discoveries made in the earlier and ongoing corporate research program.

In 1985 the company officially changed its name, once again, to Interstate Industries, Inc. This reflected Monroe's analogy of how the use of Hemi-Sync serves as a ramp from the "local road" to the "interstate" in allowing people to go "full steam ahead" in the exploration of consciousness, avoiding all of the stops and starts.

The research subsidiary was divested and established as an independent non-profit organization, The Monroe Institute, later in 1985. Interstate Industries, Inc. remains a privately held company, now doing business as Monroe Products. His daughter, Laurie Monroe, continued her father's program until her death in 2006. Under the current direction of another of Monroe's daughters, Maria Monroe Whitehead, Monroe's stepson, A. J. Honeycutt, and Teresa West, president of Monroe Products, the company's objective is to continue to expand the Hemi-Sync line of products and their benefits into markets worldwide.

The Monroe Institute (TMI) is a nonprofit education and research organization devoted to the exploration of human consciousness, based in Faber, Virginia, United States. Upwards of 20,000 people are estimated to have attended TMI's residential Gateway program during its first thirty years. TMI claims a policy of no dogma or bias with respect to belief system, religion, political or social stance. The institute is housed in several buildings on 300 acres (1.2 km^{2}) of land south of Charlottesville, Virginia, US.

In 1978, the U.S. military evaluated TMI and arranged to send officers there for OBE/OOBE training. In 1983, it sent additional officers.

The Institute has an affiliated professional membership, and also publishes scientific papers on a subset of its own studies of altered states of consciousness.

== Coverage ==
In 1994, a front-page article in The Wall Street Journal reported confirmation from the former director of the Intelligence and Security Command of the U.S. Army sending personnel to the institute. It also stated the opinion of the head of the Zen Buddhist temple in Vancouver British Columbia that "Gateway students can reach meditation states in a week that took [me] 30 years of sitting".

A reporter for The Hook, weekly newspaper for Charlottesville, Virginia, who visited The Monroe Institute said, "...with a few exceptions, the only 'normal' people with whom I could fully identify were the trainers, who seemed remarkably well-grounded for people whose day-to-day experiences include astral projection and disembodied spirits".

The reporter also concluded that "there is something significant being developed at the Institute. Whether it's just a brilliant guided meditation complete with trance-inducing stereoscopic sound, or a doorway to a world of spirit entities, I cannot say".

== Hemi-Sync ==
In 1975, Monroe registered the first of several patents concerning audio techniques designed to stimulate brain functions until the left and right hemispheres became synchronized. Monroe held that this state, dubbed Hemi-Sync (hemispherical synchronization), could be used to promote mental well-being or to trigger an altered state of consciousness. Monroe's concept was based on an earlier hypothesis known as binaural beats and has since been expanded upon a commercial basis by the self-help industry.

Hemi-Sync is short for Hemispheric Synchronization, also known as brainwave synchronization. Monroe indicated that the technique synchronizes the two hemispheres of one's brain, thereby creating a 'frequency-following response' designed to evoke certain effects. Hemi-Sync has been used for many purposes, including relaxation and sleep induction, learning and memory aids, helping those with physical and mental difficulties, reducing the need for painkillers after surgeries, and reaching altered states of consciousness through the use of sound.

The technique involves using sound waves to entrain brain waves. Wearing headphones, Monroe claimed that brains respond by producing a third sound (called binaural beats) that encouraged various brainwave activity changes. In 2002, a University of Virginia presentation at the Society for Psychophysiologial Research examined Monroe's claim. The presentation demonstrated that EEG changes did not occur when the standard electromagnetic headphones of Monroe's setup were replaced by air conduction headphones, which were connected to a remote transducer by rubber tubes. This suggests that the basis for the entrainment effects is electromagnetic rather than acoustical.

Replicated, double-blind, randomized trials on anesthetized patients have found Hemi-Sync effective as a partial replacement for fentanyl during surgery. A similar study found it ineffective at replacing propofol, however.

== Bibliography ==
- Monroe, Robert (1971). Journeys Out of the Body (1st ed.). Garden City, New York: Doubleday. p. 297. ISBN 978-0385008617. OCLC 207277.
- Monroe, Robert (1985). Far Journeys (1st ed.). Garden City, New York: Doubleday. p. 290. ISBN 978-0385231824. OCLC 11755227.
- Monroe, Robert (1994). Ultimate Journey (1st ed.). Garden City, New York: Doubleday. p. 303. ISBN 978-0385472081. OCLC 28721578.

== See also ==
- Astral projection or Out-of-body experience
- Human enhancement
- Induced activity
- Lucid dreaming
- Parapsychology
- Reality shifting
