= Vincent Turvey =

British mystic

Vincent Newton Turvey (1873-1912) was a British clairvoyant and engineer known in the field of parapsychology for his early book that records his out-of-body experiences.

In 1902, Turvey suffered from serious health problems, he gave up his profession of engineering and took interest in occult philosophy and yoga. His book The Beginnings of Seership (1911) records his alleged clairvoyant and out-of-body experiences.

== See also ==
- Oliver Fox
- Sylvan Muldoon

== Publications ==
- The Beginnings of Seership; Or, Super-normal Mental Activity (1911)
