= Taisha Abelar =

American writer and anthropologist

- Born: Maryann Simko
- Education: University of California, Los Angeles (PhD)
- Occupations: Anthropologist, writer
- Writing career
- Pen name: Anna Marie Carter (1974)
- Period: 20th century
- Subject: Shamanism
- Notable work: The Sorcerer's Crossing: A Woman’s Journey

Taisha Abelar (born Maryann Simko) was an American writer and anthropologist who was an associate of Carlos Castaneda. She disappeared shortly after Castaneda's death in April 1998.

== Biography ==
Abelar met Castaneda when she was 19 years old and a student at University of California, Los Angeles where she eventually earned her master's degree and PhD in anthropology. In 1973, Castaneda purchased a compound on Pandora Avenue in Westwood, Los Angeles, and soon after Abelar (she was still known as Maryann Simko at this time), along with Regine Thal and Kathleen Pohlman, who would come to be known collectively as "the witches", moved in. In 1974, Samurai magazine published photos of Regine Thal doing karate exercises. In the article, Abelar is called "Anna Marie Carter".

In keeping with Castaneda's philosophy of "erasing personal history", the witches maintained a tight veil of secrecy. They used numerous aliases and generally did not allow themselves to be photographed. Not long after moving into Castaneda's compound Maryann Simko changed her name to Taisha Abelar. Likewise, Regine Thal changed her name to Florinda Donner and Kathleen Pohlman to Carol Tiggs.

Abelar claimed to have been one of Don Juan’s four students and says she spent a year in his "magical house" in Mexico. In 1992, her book The Sorcerer's Crossing: A Woman’s Journey, which documents the training she received from the female members of don Juan's group, was published by Viking Books.

Through the 1990s, Abelar and the other witches started giving workshops in Tensegrity for Cleargreen Incorporated, a company formed by Castaneda for that purpose.

== Disappearance ==
In April 1998 – shortly after Castaneda's death – Abelar disappeared, together with four other close associates of Castaneda (Florinda Donner, Amalia Marquez (also known as Talia Bey), Kylie Lundahl, and Patricia Lee Partin). Partin's sun-bleached skeleton was discovered in 2003 by hikers in Death Valley's Panamint Dunes area, and identified in 2006 by DNA testing. The investigating authorities ruled the cause of death as undetermined. No trace of the other four women has been found.

== See also ==
- List of people who disappeared mysteriously (2000–present)

== Publications ==
- The Sorcerer's Crossing: A Woman's Journey. Viking Books. 1992. ISBN 978-0-670-84272-8.
