= Mindstream =

Buddhist concept of continuity of mind

Mindstream (Pali: citta-santāna, Sanskrit: citta-saṃtāna, Tibetan: sems-rgyud, Ch: xin xiangxu 心相續) in Buddhist philosophy is the moment-to-moment continuum of sense impressions and mental phenomena (citta), which is also described as continuing from one life to another. Often described as a "stream of mind" or "mental continuum," the mindstream is not a static entity but a dynamic flow of arising and passing mental phenomena, which refers as a string of passing moments that happen either in the same lifetime or in the transitional period between one life and another.

== Definition ==
Citta-saṃtāna (Sanskrit), literally "the stream of mind", is the continuum, succession, or flow of succeeding moments of mind or awareness. Similarly, the mindstream is the ongoing flow of conscious experience, even though each individual moment of consciousness ceases as the next arises. It provides a continuity of mentation in the absence of a permanently abiding "self" (ātman), which Buddhism denies. The mindstream provides a continuity from one life to another, akin to the flame of a candle which may be passed from one candle to another: (Note: Compare the analogies in the Milinda Panha.) William Waldron writes that "Indian Buddhists see the 'evolution' of mind i[n] terms of the continuity of individual mind-streams from one lifetime to the next, with karma as the basic causal mechanism whereby transformations are transmitted from one life to the next."

According to Waldron, "[T]he mind stream (santāna) increases gradually by the mental afflictions (kleśa) and by actions (karma), and goes again to the next world. In this way the circle of existence is without beginning."

The vāsanās "karmic imprints" provide the karmic continuity between lives and between moments. According to Lusthaus, these vāsanās determine how one "actually sees and experiences the world in certain ways, and one actually becomes a certain type of person, embodying certain theories which immediately shape the manner in which we experience."

== Etymology ==
=== Sanskrit ===
Citta mean "that which is conscious". Citta has two aspects: "...Its two aspects are attending to and collecting of impressions or traces (Sanskrit: vāsanā) cf. vijñāna." Saṃtāna or santāna (Sanskrit) means "eternal", "continuum", "a series of momentary events" or "life-stream".

=== Tibetan ===
Citta is often rendered as sems in Tibetan and saṃtāna corresponds to rgyud. Citta-saṃtāna is therefore rendered sems rgyud. Rgyud is the term that Tibetan translators (Tibetan: lotsawa) employed to render the Sanskrit term "tantra".

Thugs-rgyud is a synonym for sems rgyud.

=== Chinese, Korean and Japanese ===
The Chinese equivalent of Sanskrit citta-saṃtāna and Tibetan sems-kyi rgyud ("mindstream") is xin xiangxu (simplified Chinese: 心相续; traditional Chinese: 心相續; pinyin: xīn xiāngxù; Wade–Giles: hsin hsiang-hsü). According to the Digital Dictionary of Buddhism, xīn xiāngxù means "continuance of the mental stream" (from Sanskrit citta-saṃtāna or citta-saṃtati), contrasted with wú xiàngxù 無相續 "no continuity of the mental stream" (from asaṃtāna or asaṃdhi) and shì xiāngxù 識相續 "stream of consciousness" (from vijñāna-saṃtāna).

This compound combines xin 心 "heart; mind; thought; conscience; core" and xiangxu "succeed each other", with xiang 相 "form, appearance, countenance, phenomenon" and xu 續 or 续 "continue; carry on; succeed". Thus it means "the continuum of mind and phenomena".

Xin xiangxu is pronounced sim sangsok in Korean and shin sōzoku in Japanese.

== Origins and development ==
Buddhists in India regard the notion of citta-santāna developed in later Yogacara-thought, where citta-santāna replaced the notion of ālayavijñāna, the store-house consciousness in which the karmic seeds were stored. This means that karma and kleshas (states of mental torment) both act to pass our transformation to the following life not a "permanent, unchanging, transmigrating entity", like the atman, but a series of momentary consciousnesses.

Lusthaus describes the development and doctrinal relationships of the store consciousness (ālaya-vijñāna) and Buddha nature (tathāgatagarbha) in Yogācāra. To avoid reification of the ālaya-vijñāna,

The logico-epistemological wing in part sidestepped the critique by using the term citta-santāna, "mind-stream", instead of ālaya-vijñāna, for what amounted to roughly the same idea. It was easier to deny that a "stream" represented a reified self.

Dharmakīrti (fl. 7th century) wrote a treatise on the nature of the mind stream in his Substantiation of Other mind streams (Saṃtãnãntarasiddhi). According to Dharmakirti the mind stream was beginningless temporal sequence.

The notion of mind stream was further developed in Vajrayāna (tantric Buddhism), where "mind stream" (sems-rgyud) may be understood as a stream of succeeding moments, within a lifetime, but also in-between lifetimes. The 14th Dalai Lama holds it to be a continuum of consciousness, extending over succeeding lifetimes, though without a self or soul.

== See also ==
=== Buddhist and common to Indian religions concepts ===
- Bardo
- Buddhist atomism
- Buddhist logico-epistemology
- Dream yoga
- Illusory body
- Impermanence
- Luminous mind
- Maya
- Rainbow body
- Saṃsāra
- Svabhava
- Trikaya
- Yoga nidra

=== Similar concepts of other traditions ===
- Antahkarana
- Astral body
- Astral projection
- Bodymind
- Divine illumination
- Divine spark
- Energy being
- Etheric body
- Inner space
- Lucid dream
- Mental body
- Mental world
- Metacognition
- Metempsychosis
- Mindfulness
- Mind-wandering
- Personal identity
- Psyche
- Reincarnation
- Stream of consciousness
- Subtle body
