= Mental body =

Concept in theosophy and other philosophies

The mental body (the mind) is one of the subtle bodies in esoteric philosophies, in some religious teachings and in New Age thought. It is understood as a sort of body made up of thoughts, just as the emotional body consists of emotions and the physical body is made up of matter. In occult understanding, thoughts are not just subjective qualia, but have an existence apart from the associated physical organ, the brain.

== Theosophical and New Age conceptions ==
According to Theosophists C.W. Leadbeater and Annie Besant (Adyar School of Theosophy), and later Alice Bailey, the mental body is equivalent to the "Lower Manas" of Blavatsky's original seven principles of man. But the New Age writer Barbara Brennan describes the Mental body as intermediate between the Emotional and the Astral body in terms of the layers in the "Human Energy Field" or Aura.

The mental body is usually considered in terms of an aura that includes thoughtforms. In Theosophical and Alice Bailey's teachings, it corresponds to the Mental plane.

== The mind in the Western Wisdom Teachings ==
According to Max Heindel's Rosicrucian writings, the mind is the latest acquisition of the human spirit and is related to the Region of Concrete Thought, which is the lower region of the World of Thought. It is not yet an organized body, and in most people it is still a mere inchoate cloud disposed particularly in the region of the head. It works as the link or focus between the threefold Spirit and the threefold body , in a reversed reflexion manner : the mind is like the projecting lens of a stereopticon, it projects the image in one of three directions, according to the will of the thinker, which ensouls the thought-form.

His writings, called Western Wisdom Teachings, give a clear description on how the man's inner Spirit perceives, from the world of thought, the lower worlds through the mind: " We ourselves, as Egos, function directly in the subtle substance of the Region of Abstract Thought, which we have specialized within the periphery of our individual aura. Thence we view the impressions made by the outer world upon the vital body through the senses, together with the feelings and emotions generated by them in the desire body, and mirrored in the mind. From these mental images we form our conclusions, in the substance of the Region of Abstract Thought, concerning the subjects with which they deal. Those conclusions are ideas. By the power of will, we project an idea through the mind, where it takes concrete shape as a thought-form by drawing mind-stuff around itself from the Region of Concrete Thought. ".

He also states that to the trained clairvoyant there appears to be an empty space in the center of the forehead just above and between the eyebrows and it looks like the blue part of a gas flame, but not even the most gifted seer can penetrate that veil, also known as "THE VEIL OF ISIS".

== Samael Aun Weor ==
Samael Aun Weor stated that only those who have worked consciously to do so have created a mental body. A "solar mind" or "solar mental body" is the quality of mind of a true human, yet, it is stated that this humanity is not composed of true humans, but rather intellectual animals: beings with a mind of an animal, but reasoning superior to that of other animals. According to Samael Aun Weor, the qualifications to being a real human being is identical to the lowest requirements of being a Buddha. The process of acquiring the mind of a human in this sense involves the psychological death of the "I" (desire) and the work of practical sexual alchemy. More explicitly stated, the title of Buddha is achieved through the Fourth Initiation of Major Mysteries, when the fourth serpent of fire or kundalini has risen.

The intellectual animal does not have a Mental Body, but he possesses a subtle, lunar, intellectual animal vehicle, which is very similar to the Mental Body, but of a cold and ghost-like nature.

Whether the lunar or solar aspect, the mental body is stated to exist within the 5th dimension and is represented by Netzach. With the mental body, one can travel through the mental world, the world of thoughts and ideas.

In Esoteric Christianity, the mental body is represented by the stubborn yet useful donkey that the Savior (Christ) subdues in order to be used as a vehicle to enter into heavenly Jerusalem (the superior worlds).

== See also ==
- Esoteric
  - Astral body
  - Bodymind (in meditation traditions)
  - Divine spark
  - Esoteric cosmology
  - Etheric body
  - Illusory body
  - Luminous mind
  - Spiritual evolution
  - Subtle body
  - Thoughtforms
- Science
  - Consciousness
  - Energy being
  - Inner space
  - Mental world
  - Mind
  - Mindstream
  - Mind–body problem
  - Philosophy of mind
  - Psyche
  - Stream of consciousness
  - Theory of mind
