= Turvey =

Turvey may refer to:

== As a surname ==
=== Sport ===
- Anna Turvey (born 1980), Irish cyclist
- Cedric Turvey (1917–1991), Australian rugby league footballer
- Joanne Turvey (born 1969), British rower
- Nathan Turvey (born 1977), Australian rules footballer
- Oliver Turvey (born 1987), British racing driver

=== Other ===
- Brad Turvey (born 1978), Filipino actor
- Cassius Turvey (2007–2022), Aboriginal Australian boy killed in Perth
- Hugh Turvey (born 1971), British artist and photographer
- John Turvey (1944–2006), Canadian social worker
- Malcolm Turvey, British film studies professor
- Michael Turvey, American psychology professor
- Nick Turvey (1931–2006), South African pilot
- Philip Turvey (1875–1955), Australian politician
- Vincent Turvey (1873–1912), clairvoyant and parapsychologist
- Yi-pei Chou Turvey, Scottish politician

=== Fictional characters ===
- Kevin Turvey, 1980s British TV comedy character played by Rik Mayall

== Places ==
- Turvey, Bedfordshire, England, a village
- Turvey House, County Dublin, Ireland, manor house demolished in 1987
- Turvey House and Gardens, a country house in Bedfordshire
- Turvey Park, New South Wales, a suburb of Wagga Wagga

== See also ==
- Alan Turvey Trophy, a football tournament in England
- Turvey railway station, former station in England
