= Faber, Virginia =

Unincorporated community in Virginia, US

Coordinates: 37°49′55″N 78°44′15″W

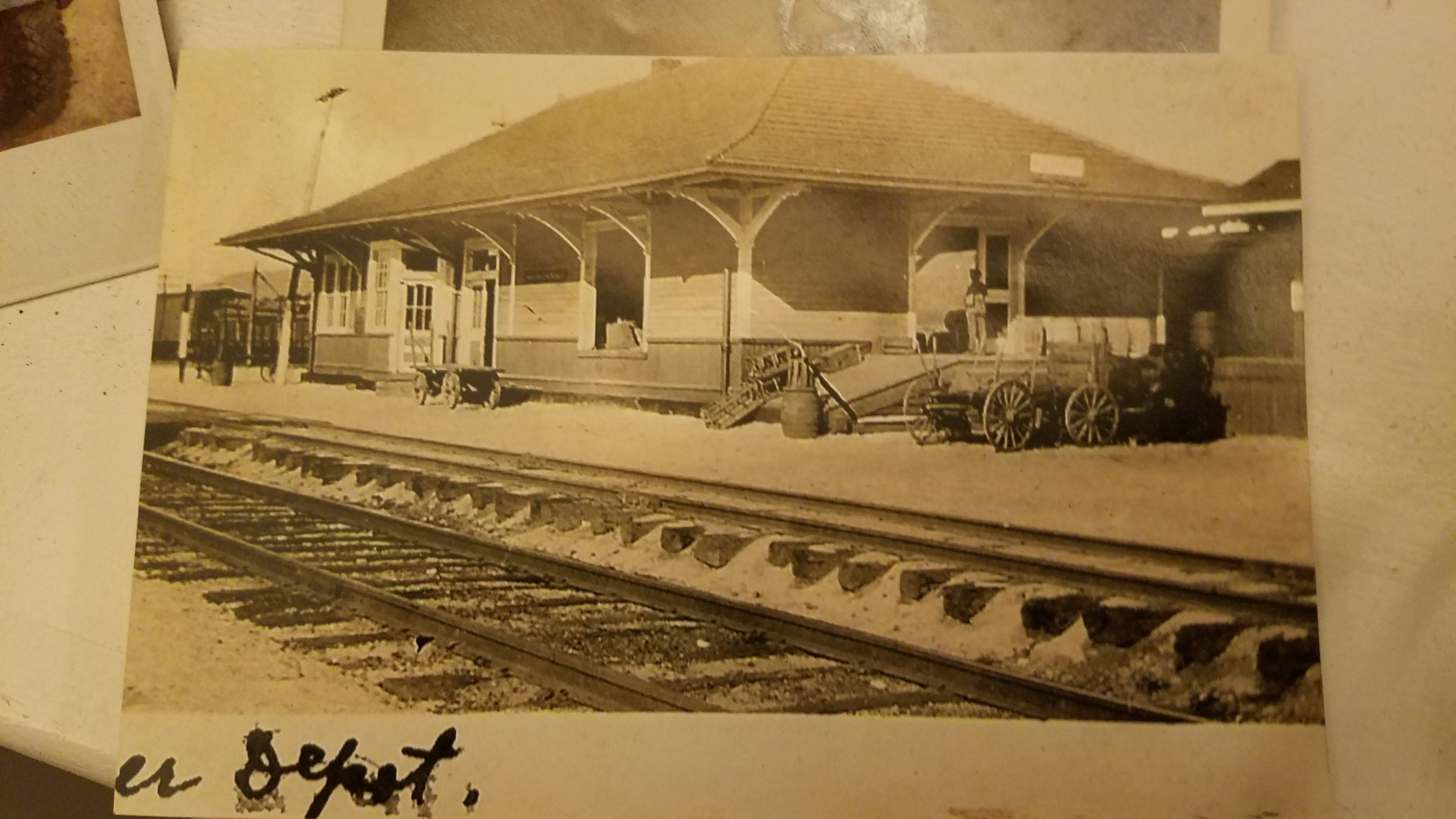
Once the epicenter of Faber, the depot sat across from the former Lambert's mercantile and post office.

Faber is an unincorporated community in Nelson County, Virginia, United States. It is the location of the Monroe Institute.

Faber was one of the communities mentioned in several episodes of the television series, The Waltons. The family drama about post-Great Depression rural Virginia drew from the geography of Faber and nearby Schuyler and involved the Schuyler Baptist Church.
