= Mental world =

Ontological category in metaphysics

The mental world or mindscape is an ontological category in metaphysics, populated by nonmaterial mental objects, without physical extension (though possibly with mental extension as in a visual field, or possibly not, as in an olfactory field) contrasted with the physical world of space and time populated with physical objects, or Plato's world of ideals populated, in part, with mathematical objects.

== Properties ==
The mental world may be populated with, or framed with, intentions, sensory fields, and corresponding objects.

The mental world is usually considered to be subjective and not objective.

In psychologism, mathematical objects are mental objects.

== Relation to physical world ==
Descartes argued for a mental world as separate from the physical world. Debates regarding free will include how it could be possible for anything in the mental world to have an effect on the physical world. In various forms of Epiphenomenalism, the physical world can cause effects in the mental world, but not conversely.

== See also ==
- Mental body
- Mind-body dualism
- Mind-body problem
- Mindstream
- Mind-wandering
- Metacognition
- Inner space
- Descartes
- Berkeley
- Behaviorism
- Mental operations
- Object of the mind
