= A Separate Reality =

1971 book by Carlos Castaneda

- First edition cover (paperback)
- Author: Carlos Castaneda
- Language: English
- Genre: Memoir
- Publisher: Simon & Schuster
- Publication date: 1971
- Publication place: United States
- Media type: Print (Hardcover & Paperback)
- Pages: 272
- ISBN: 978-0-671-73249-3
- OCLC: 24387280
- Preceded by: The Teachings of Don Juan
- Followed by: Journey to Ixtlan

A Separate Reality: Further Conversations With Don Juan is a book written by author/anthropologist Carlos Castaneda, published in 1971, concerning the events that took place during his apprenticeship with a Yaqui Indian Sorcerer, Don Juan Matus, between 1960 and 1965.

== Content ==
In the book, Castaneda continues his description of his apprenticeship under the tutelage of Don Juan. As in his previous book, The Teachings of Don Juan: A Yaqui Way of Knowledge, Castaneda describes the experiences he has with Don Juan while under the influence of the psychotropic plants that Don Juan offered him, peyote (Lophophora williamsii) and a smokable mixture of what Castaneda believed to be, among other plants, dried mushroom of the genus Psilocybe. The main focus of the book centered on Don Juan's attempts at getting Carlos to See, a practice best described as, in Castaneda's own words, "perceiving energy directly as it flows through the universe".

The book contains an introduction, an epilogue and two separate parts. Part One, "The Preliminaries of 'Seeing'", describes his re-initiation into the apprenticeship from which he withdrew in late 1965, and also describes his introduction to another brujo (sorcerer) named Don Genaro. Part Two, "The Task of 'Seeing'", elaborates on the mental processes involved with Seeing, and begins with Castaneda realizing that the plants are a necessary tool to arrive at Seeing.

== Sources ==
- Castaneda, Carlos. The Teachings of Don Juan: A Yaqui Way of Knowledge, 30th Anniversary Edition. New York: Washington Square Press, 1998
- Castaneda, Carlos. A Separate Reality. New York: Pocket Books, 1971
