= The Teachings of Don Juan =

Book by Carlos Castaneda

The Teachings of Don Juan: A Yaqui Way of Knowledge
- Cover of 30th anniversary edition
- Author: Carlos Castaneda
- Language: English
- Genre: Anthropology, memoir
- Publisher: University of California Press
- Publication date: 1968
- Publication place: United States
- Media type: Print (Hardcover & Paperback)
- Pages: 196
- Followed by: A Separate Reality

The Teachings of Don Juan: A Yaqui Way of Knowledge was published by the University of California Press in 1968 as a work of anthropology, though it is now widely considered a work of fiction. It was written by Carlos Castaneda and submitted as his master's thesis in anthropology. It purports to document events that took place during an apprenticeship with a self-proclaimed Yaqui Indian sorcerer, don Juan Matus from Sonora, Mexico, between 1960 and 1965.

== Synopsis ==
The book is divided into two sections. The first section, The Teachings, is a first-person narrative that documents Castaneda's initial interactions with don Juan. He speaks of his encounters with Mescalito (a teaching spirit inhabiting all peyote plants), divination with lizards and flying using the "yerba del diablo" (lit. "Devil's Weed"; Jimson weed), and turning into a blackbird using "humito" (lit. "little smoke"; a smoked powder containing Psilocybe mexicana). The second, A Structural Analysis, is an attempt at disclosing "the internal cohesion and the cogency of don Juan's Teachings."

== Publication history ==
The 30th-anniversary edition, published by the University of California Press in 1998, contains commentary by Castaneda not present in the original edition. He writes of a general discouragement from the project by his professors (besides Clement Woodward Meighan, a professor who supported the project early in its conception. In the foreword, Castaneda gives "full credit" for the approval of his dissertation to Meighan). He offers a new thesis on a mind-state he calls "total freedom" and claims that he used the teachings of his Yaqui shaman as "springboards into new horizons of cognition". In addition, it contains a foreword by anthropologist Walter Goldschmidt, who was a professor of anthropology at UCLA during the time the books were written, and an introduction by the author.

A 40th anniversary edition was published by the University of California Press in 2008.

== Reception ==
The book was a New York Times best-seller. The book and its sequels sold over 10 million copies in the United States.

== See also ==
- Castaneda bibliography
