= J. Arthur Hill =

John Arthur Hill (4 December 1872 – 22 March 1951), best known as J. Arthur Hill, was a British psychical researcher and writer. He is credited with having coined the term out-of-the-body experience in 1918.

== Biography ==
Hill was born in Halifax, West Yorkshire, and was educated at Thornton Grammar School. He worked as a business manager until he suffered ill health. He was a member of the Society for Psychical Research (1927–1935) and was known for his writings on parapsychology and spiritualism.

In 1914, Hill wrote an article Is the Earth Alive? which was later expanded into a chapter in his Psychical Miscellanea (1920). Influenced by Gustav Fechner he speculated that the earth is a living spirit being. Reviewers ridiculed this belief.

Hill greatly admired the philosophy of Ralph Waldo Emerson. In 1919, he wrote a book on the subject.

== Reception ==
Hill's most known work was his Spiritualism: Its History, Phenomena and Doctrine (1919). Arthur Conan Doyle wrote a supportive introduction to the book but later commented in 1926 that it was "written from a strictly psychic research point of view, and is far behind the real provable facts." Psychical researcher Hereward Carrington described the book as a "fair and impartial summary."

His books were criticized by skeptics. Psychologist Millais Culpin wrote that Hill was gullible in trusting the word of mediums and did not know anything about dissociation.

== See also ==
- Edward Trusted Bennett

== Publications ==
- Religion and Modern Psychology (London: William Rider & Son, 1911)
- New Evidences in Psychical Research (London: William Rider & Son, 1911) [With an introduction by Oliver Lodge]
- The Hope of Immortality - Is it Reasonable?. In What Happens After Death? A Symposium by Leading Writers and Thinkers. (New York: Funk & Wagnalls Company, 1916)
- Psychical Investigations (New York: Doran, 1917)
- Emerson and His Philosophy (William Rider & Son, 1919)
- Spiritualism and Psychical Research (London: T. C. & E. C. Jack, 1919)
- Man is Spirit (New York: Doran, 1918)
- Spiritualism: Its History, Phenomena and Doctrine (New York: Doran, 1919) [With an introduction by Arthur Conan Doyle]
- Psychical Miscellanea (New York: Harcourt, Brace & Howe, 1920)
- From Agnosticism to Belief (London: Methuen & Co, 1924)
- Psychical Science and Religious Belief (London: Rider & Company, 1929)
- Letters from Sir Oliver Lodge (London: Cassell, 1932)
- Experiences With Mediums (London: Rider & Company, 1934)
- Towards Cheerfulness (London: Rider & Company, 1935)
