= Journey to Ixtlan =

1972 book by Carlos Castaneda

- Cover of Simon & Schuster paperback edition
- Author: Carlos Castaneda
- Language: English
- Genre: Nonfiction memoir
- Publisher: Simon & Schuster
- Publication date: 1972
- Publication place: United States
- Media type: Print (hardcover & paperback)
- Pages: 268
- ISBN: 0-671-73246-3
- OCLC: 24114170
- Preceded by: A Separate Reality
- Followed by: Tales of Power

Journey to Ixtlan is the third book by Carlos Castaneda, published as a work of nonfiction by Simon & Schuster in 1972. It is about an apprenticeship to the Yaqui shaman Don Juan.

The title of this book is taken from an allegory that is recounted to Castaneda by his "benefactor" who is known to Carlos as Don Genaro (Genaro Flores), a close friend of his teacher don Juan Matus. "Ixtlan" turns out to be a metaphorical hometown (or "place", "position of being") to which the "sorcerer" or warrior or man of knowledge is drawn to return, trying to get home. After the work of "stopping", his changed perspective leaves him little in common with ordinary people, who now seem no more substantial to him than "phantoms". The point of the story is that a man of knowledge, or sorcerer, is a changed being, or a Human closer to his true state of Being, and for that reason he can never truly go "home" to his old lifestyle again.

In Journey to Ixtlan Castaneda essentially reevaluates the teachings up to that point. He discusses information that was apparently missing from the first two books regarding stopping the world which previously he had only regarded as a metaphor.

He also finds that psychotropic plants, knowledge of which was a significant part of his apprenticeship to Yaqui shaman don Juan Matus, are not as important in the world view as he had previously thought. In the introduction he writes:

My basic assumption in both books has been that the articulation points in learning to be a sorcerer were the states of nonordinary reality produced by the ingestion of psychotropic plants ...

My perception of the world through the effects of those psychotropics had been so bizarre and impressive that I was forced to assume that such states were the only avenue to communicating and learning what Don Juan was attempting to teach me.

That assumption was erroneous.

In the book don Juan takes Carlos on these various degrees of apprenticeship, in response to what he believes are signals from the phenomenological world, "The decision as to who can be a warrior and who can only be a hunter is not up to us. That decision is in the realm of the powers that guide men."

The book shows a progression between different states of learning, from hunter, to warrior, to man of knowledge or sorcerer, the difference said to be one of skill level and the type of thing hunted, "... a warrior is an impeccable hunter that hunts power. If he succeeds in his hunting he becomes a man of knowledge."

Throughout the book Castaneda portrays himself as skeptical and reserved in his explanations of the phenomena at hand, but by the end of the book Castaneda's rationalist worldview is seen to be breaking down in the face of an onslaught of experiences that he is unable to explain logically.

== See also ==
- Carlos Castaneda bibliography
