= Svapna =

Sanskrit term for dream

Svapna (Sanskrit: स्वप्न, romanized: svapna) is the Sanskrit word for a dream. In Hindu philosophy, svapna is a state of consciousness when a person is dreaming or is asleep. In this state, he or she cannot perceive the external universe with the senses. This state may contain the conscious activities of memory or imagination. It is typically compared with the states of wakeful consciousness (jagarata), deep sleep in which no cognition occurs (sushupti), and the fourth state known as turiya. These four states of consciousness are described in the Chandogya Upanishad and recur commonly in the literature of yoga.

== See also ==
- Jagarata
- Dream yoga
- Yoga nidra
