= Jagarata =

Sanskrit term for wakefulness

Jagarata (Sanskrit: जगराता, romanized: jagarātā), also commonly rendered jagrata, is the Sanskrit term for wakefulness and vigilance. It is one of the four states of consciousness in Hindu philosophy. It is that part of consciousness when a person or being can sense this physical universe. Other states of consciousness are svapna, sushupti, and turiya.
