= Stream of consciousness (psychology) =

Thoughts flowing through the conscious mind

The metaphor "stream of consciousness" is commonly used to describe the continuous flow of thoughts within first-person subjective experience. Research studies have shown that humans only experience one mental event at a time, as a fast-moving mind-stream. The full range of thoughts and sensory experiences one can be aware of forms the content of this "stream".

The term was coined by Alexander Bain in 1855, when he wrote in The Senses and the Intellect, "The concurrence of Sensations in one common stream of consciousness (on the same cerebral highway) enables those of different senses to be associated as readily as the sensations of the same sense". The term is most commonly associated with American psychologist and philosopher William James, who popularised it in his 1890 work The Principles of Psychology.

== Buddhism ==
Early Buddhist scriptures describe the "stream of consciousness" (Pali; viññāna-sota) where it is referred to as the Mindstream. The practice of mindfulness, which is about being aware moment-to-moment of one's subjective conscious experience, aid one to directly experience the "stream of consciousness" and to gradually cultivate self-knowledge and wisdom.

Buddhist teachings describe the continuous flow of the "stream of mental and material events" as including sensory experiences (i.e., seeing, hearing, smelling, tasting, touch sensations, or a thought relating to the past, present or future) as well as various mental events that are generated, namely, feelings, perceptions and intentions/behaviour. These mental events are also described as being influenced by other factors such as attachments and past conditioning. Further, the moment-by-moment manifestation of the "stream of consciousness" is described as being affected by physical laws, biological laws, psychological laws, volitional laws, and universal laws.

== Proponents ==
In his lectures circa 1838–1839 Sir William Hamilton, 9th Baronet described "thought" as "a series of acts indissolubly connected"; this comes about because of what he asserted was a fourth "law of thought" known as the "law of reason and consequent":

"The logical significance of the law of Reason and Consequent lies in this, – That in virtue of it, thought is constituted into a series of acts all indissolubly connected; each necessarily inferring the other" (Hamilton 1860:61-62).

In this context the words "necessarily infer" are synonymous with "imply". In further discussion Hamilton identified "the law" with modus ponens; thus the act of "necessarily infer" detaches the consequent for purposes of becoming the (next) antecedent in a "chain" of connected inferences.

William James asserts the notion as follows:

"Consciousness, then, does not appear to itself chopped up in bits. Such words as 'chain' or 'train' do not describe it fitly as it presents itself in the first instance. It is nothing jointed; it flows. A 'river' or a 'stream' are the metaphors by which it is most naturally described. In talking of it hereafter let us call it the stream of thought, of consciousness, or of subjective life. (James 1890:239)

He was enormously skeptical about using introspection as a technique to understand the stream of consciousness. "The attempt at introspective analysis in these cases is in fact like seizing a spinning top to catch its motion, or trying to turn up the gas quickly enough to see how the darkness looks." However, the epistemological separation of two levels of analyses appears to be important in order to systematically understand the "stream of consciousness. "

This relates to the refrigerator-light problem. In this illusion, we only observe the fridge light being on, not noticing that it turns off when we close it. When we check to see if the light turned off, we are unable to, as it turns back on when opened. This shows how it is impossible to examine our unconscious thoughts, as when we think of them, our thoughts become conscious.

Bernard Baars has developed Global Workspace Theory which bears some resemblance to stream of consciousness.

Conceptually understanding what is meant by the "present moment," "the past" and "the future" can aid one to systematically understand the "stream of consciousness."

== Criticism ==
Susan Blackmore challenged the concept of stream of consciousness. "When I say that consciousness is an illusion I do not mean that consciousness does not exist. I mean that consciousness is not what it appears to be. If it seems to be a continuous stream of rich and detailed experiences, happening one after the other to a conscious person, this is the illusion." However, she also says that a good way to observe the "stream of consciousness" may be to calm the mind in meditation. The criticism is based on the stream of perception data from the senses rather than about consciousness itself. Also, it is not explained the reason why some things are conscious at all.

Bernard Baars is in agreement with Blackmore's points. The continuity of the "stream of consciousness" may in fact be illusory, just as the continuity of a movie is illusory. Nevertheless, the seriality of mutually incompatible conscious events is well supported by objective research over some two centuries of experimental work. A simple illustration would be to try to be conscious of two interpretations of an ambiguous figure or word at the same time. When timing is precisely controlled, as in the case of the audio and video tracks of the same movie, seriality appears to be compulsory for potentially conscious events presented within the same 100 ms interval.

J. W. Dalton has criticized the global workspace theory on the grounds that it provides, at best, an account of the cognitive function of consciousness, and fails even to address the deeper problem of its nature, of what consciousness is, and of how any mental process whatsoever can be conscious: the so-called "hard problem of consciousness". Avshalom Elitzur has argued, however, "While this hypothesis does not address the 'hard problem', namely, the very nature of consciousness, it constrains any theory that attempts to do so and provides important insights into the relation between consciousness and cognition.", as much as any consciousness theory is constrained by the natural brain perception limitations. Work by Richard Robinson outlines the brain functions involved in this model.

Daniel Kolak has argued extensively against the existence of a stream of consciousness, in the sense of someone having a continuous identity over time, in his book I am You. Kolak describes three opposing philosophical views regarding the continuity of consciousness: Closed individualism, Empty individualism, and Open individualism. Closed Individualism is defined as the default common sense view of identity where one's identity consists of a line stretching across time, which Kolak, argues is incoherent. Empty Individualism is the view that one's identity only exists for an infinitesimally small amount of time, and an individual person has an entirely different identity from moment to moment. Kolak instead advocates for Open Individualism, which is the view that everyone is in reality the same being, and that the "self" doesn't actually exist at all, similar to anattā in Buddhist philosophy.

Derek Parfit is another philosopher who has challenged the idea of the existence of a continuous stream of consciousness over time. In his book Reasons and Persons, Parfit describes the teletransportation paradox thought experiment, which describes the difficulties in distinguishing one's future self from an entity that is merely a copy of oneself.

It has further been emphasized that explaining the "stream of consciousness" requires differentiating between two distinct levels of analysis. The first is the subjective first-person perspective, encompassing the moment-to-moment flow of subjective conscious experience involving the present moment, the past and the future, and constitutes the experiential stream. The second refers to objective, third-person accounts of the world, where scientific understandings apply.

== Literary technique ==
In literature, stream of consciousness writing is a literary device which seeks to portray an individual's point of view by giving the written equivalent of the character's thought processes, either in a loose interior monologue, or in connection to his or her sensory reactions to external occurrences. Stream-of-consciousness as a narrative device is strongly associated with the modernist movement. The term was first applied in a literary context, transferred from psychology, in The Egoist, April 1918, by May Sinclair, in relation to the early volumes of Dorothy Richardson's novel sequence Pilgrimage. Amongst other modernist novelists who used it are James Joyce in Ulysses (1922) and William Faulkner in The Sound and the Fury (1929).

=== Inner space ===
In science fiction, inner space refers to works of psychological science fiction that emphasize internal, mental, and emotional experiences over external adventure or technological speculation, which defined it as "a category introduced to science fiction by representatives of the New Wave to designate internal, mental experiences as imaginary worlds with no connection to the real world" contrasts with traditional science fiction's fascination with outer space.

Works from this genre appeared as part of the emergence of the New Wave in science fiction in the 1960s. They were popularized by English writer J.G. Ballard and associated with the New Wave movement in science fiction. Subsequent contributions by critics and writers such as Michael Moorcock, Pat Cadigan, and Greg Bear helped establish inner space as a recurring theme in science fiction discourse.

Rob Mayo wrote that the 1980s was the second "golden age" of inner space, associated with writers such as Pat Cadigan and Greg Bear; he also notes the movie Dreamscape (1984), which he calls "the first inner space film". He notes that the genre once again returned the 2000s, here noting the movies The Cell (2000) and Inception (2010), as well as the video game Psychonauts (2005). He notes that Inception marked "the transition of inner space fiction from a marginal genre (SF literature) to a viable mainstream (Hollywood cinema)".

== See also ==
- Edmund Husserl
- Free recall
- Inner space
- Introspection
- Mindstream
- Monkey mind
- Mind-wandering
- Phenomenology (psychology)
- Psyche (psychology)
- Qualia
- Samyama
- Self-discovery
- Teletransportation paradox
- Train of thought
- Visionary fiction
