= Vestibular cortex =

Part of the brain

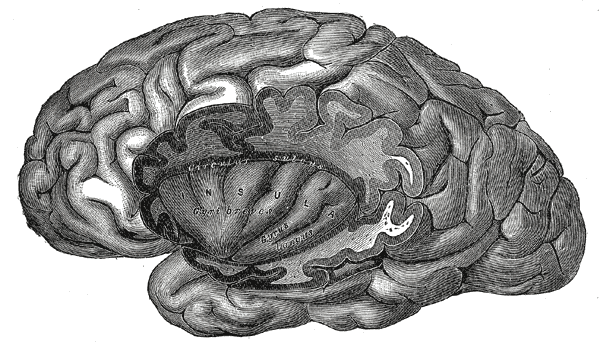
- The insula of the left side, exposed by removing the opercula. (Image is of left side, but there is some evidence that there may be right-sided dominance.)

Details

Identifiers
- Latin: Cortex vestibularis
- NeuroNames: 1390

Vestibular cortex refers to a network of cortical regions of the brain that process input from the vestibular system and contribute to perception of self-motion, spatial orientation, and balance.

Unlike primary sensory cortices, the vestibular cortex does not occupy a single, sharply defined anatomical area. Human neuroimaging, lesion, and electrical stimulation studies suggest that vestibular processing is distributed across the posterior insular cortex and adjacent parietal operculum, with additional involvement of temporo-parietal regions.

Human vestibular cortex has been localized using several vestibular stimulation paradigms in positron emission tomography (PET) and functional magnetic resonance imaging (fMRI). Direct cortical electrical stimulation in epilepsy patients can also evoke vestibular sensations (e.g. illusions of rotation or translation), providing converging evidence for peri-Sylvian vestibular-responsive regions.

Functional imaging studies suggest hemispheric asymmetry in vestibular cortical processing, with dominance often observed in the non-dominant hemisphere, corresponding to right-hemisphere dominance in most right-handed individuals.

The "temporo-peri-Sylvian vestibular cortex" (TPSVC) has been proposed as an analog to parietoinsular vestibular cortex found in monkeys.
