= The Art of Dreaming =

1993 book by Carlos Castaneda

- Cover of HarperPerennial edition (paperback)
- Author: Carlos Castaneda
- Language: English
- Genre: Memoir
- Publisher: HarperCollins
- Publication date: 1994
- Publication place: United States
- Media type: Print (Hardcover and Paperback)
- Pages: 260
- ISBN: 0-06-092554-X
- OCLC: 30675210
- Preceded by: The Power of Silence
- Followed by: Magical Passes

The Art of Dreaming is a 1993 book by the anthropologist Carlos Castaneda. It details events and techniques during a period of the author's apprenticeship with the Yaqui Indian sorcerer, don Juan Matus, between 1960 and 1973.

== Summary ==
The Art of Dreaming describes the steps needed to master the control and consciousness of dreams. The Toltecs of Don Juan Matus' lineage believed that there are seven barriers to awareness, which they termed The Seven Gates of Dreaming. In The Art of Dreaming Castaneda describes extensively how a state called Total Awareness can be achieved by means of dreaming.

According to Castaneda there are 7 Gates of Dreaming, or obstacles to awareness, which when overcome yield total awareness. Four of the Gates of Dreaming are discussed in The Art of Dreaming. What follows is not so much a technique in achieving lucidity, but rather the practical application of lucid dreaming. By acting a certain way while dreaming, one can cause psychosomatic changes in one's being, including an alternate way of dying.

What follows is a point-form summary of the philosophy surrounding Toltec dreaming:

- 1st Gate of Dreaming (stabilization of the dreaming body): Arrived at when one perceives one's hands in a dream. Solved when one is able to shift the focus from the hands to another dream object and return it to the hands, all repeated a few times. Crossed when one is able to induce a state of darkness and a feeling of increased weight while falling asleep. Location in the body – in the area at the base of the V formed by pulling the big and second toes of one foot to the sides.
- 2nd Gate of Dreaming (utilizing the dreaming body): Arrived at when one's dream objects start changing into something else. Solved when one is able to isolate a Scout and follow it to the realm of Inorganic Beings. Crossed when one is able to fall asleep without losing consciousness. It is also referred to the activity of dreaming together with other practitioners. Location in the body – in the inside area of the calf.
- 3rd Gate of Dreaming (traveling): This is what is often known as an "Out of body experience". Arrived at when one dreams of looking at oneself. Solved when the dreaming and physical bodies become one. Crossed when one is able to control the dreaming body in the physical realm and move around at ease. Location in the body – at the lowest part of the spinal column.
- 4th Gate of Dreaming (sharing): This is the last gate explained in the book as such, and crossing it consists of being able to share the intended dream reality of other people. One has to have gathered enough strength into the dreaming body through the previous gates in order to travel to other people's dreams.

== See also ==
- Astral projection – Interpretation of out-of-body experiences
- Body of light – Hermetic starfire body
- Dream argument – Postulation about the act of dreaming
- Lucid dream – Dream where one is aware that one is dreaming
