= Carlos Castaneda =

American anthropologist and writer (1925–1998)

- Carlos Castaneda in 1962
- Born: December 25, 1925; Cajamarca, Peru
- Died: April 27, 1998 (aged 72); Los Angeles, California, U.S.
- Education: UCLA (BA, PhD)
- Occupations: Anthropologist, writer
- Writing career
- Subjects: Anthropology, ethnography, shamanism, fiction

Carlos Castaneda (December 25, 1925 (Note: Castaneda's birth name, as well as the date and location of his birth, have historically been the subject of uncertainty, and Castaneda gave several different dates for his birth year. According to a 1973 article in Time, U.S. immigration records indicate that Castaneda was born Carlos Cesar Arana Castaneda on December 25, 1925, in Cajamarca, Peru. In the article, Castaneda was cited as saying that he had adopted the surname "Castaneda" later in life and that he had been born in São Paulo, Brazil. He also reported his date of birth as December 25, 1935. In other accounts he gave his date of birth as December 25, 1931. A 1981 article in The New York Times stated that Castaneda "was born Carlos Arana in a Peruvian mountain town 66 years ago", indicating a 1915 birth. Most sources tend to favor the Peruvian birth and 1925 date.)– April 27, 1998) was a Peruvian-American writer, trained as an anthropologist. Starting in 1968, Castaneda published a series of books that describe alleged training in shamanism that he received under the tutelage of a Yaqui "Man of Knowledge" named Don Juan Matus. While Castaneda's work was accepted as factual by many when the books were first published, the character of Don Juan and the training he described is now generally considered to be fabricated and to have little relation to the actual cultural practices of the Yaqui. (Note: Detailed citations can be found at § Reception.) Castaneda's early writings featuring Don Juan were bestsellers with the general public, and are considered to be a significant influence on neoshamanism and the New Age movement more broadly.

The first three books—The Teachings of Don Juan: A Yaqui Way of Knowledge, A Separate Reality, and Journey to Ixtlan—were written while he was an anthropology student at the University of California, Los Angeles (UCLA). Castaneda was awarded his bachelor's and doctoral degrees from the University of California, Los Angeles, based on the work he described in these books. Castaneda's later works have a greater focus on religious themes. Always reclusive, and following increasing doubt about the veracity of his encounters with Don Juan, in the early 1970s, Castaneda withdrew from the public eye, and began cultivating a following of young female devotees whom he called his "witches" or "chacmools" who he demanded cut off contact with their families, change their names, and sexually submit to him.

At the time of his death in 1998, Castaneda's books had sold more than eight million copies and had been published in 17 languages. Following his death, five of his closest female devotees went missing. The car and skeletal remains of one of them, Patricia Partin, were later found in Death Valley, though the fate of the other four remains unknown.

== Early life and education ==
According to his birth record, Carlos Castañeda was born Carlos César Salvador Arana on December 25, 1925, in Cajamarca, Peru, son of César Arana and Susana Castañeda. Castaneda repeatedly invented details about his background, claiming to be from a noble family, that his uncle was Brazilian diplomat Oswaldo Aranha, and he had gone to a prestigious Argentine boarding school. In reality Castaneda came from a poor background, the son of a watch repairman and goldsmith (rather than an academic as Castaneda claimed). Castaneda spent time as a child on an extended family member's chicken farm in Brazil, working on tasks such as cleaning coops. While he claimed to have spent time learning sculpture in an art school in Milan, Italy, he never did so, though he did spend time at an art school in Peru's capital, Lima. Immigration records confirm the birth record's date and place of birth. Castaneda moved to the United States in 1951 and became a naturalized citizen on June 21, 1957. Castaneda studied anthropology and was awarded his bachelor's and doctoral degrees from the University of California, Los Angeles.

== Career ==
Castaneda's first three books—The Teachings of Don Juan: A Yaqui Way of Knowledge, A Separate Reality, and Journey to Ixtlan—were written while he was an anthropology student at the University of California, Los Angeles (UCLA). He wrote that these books were ethnographic accounts describing his apprenticeship with a traditional "Man of Knowledge" identified as Don Juan Matus, an Indigenous Yaqui from northern Mexico. The veracity of these books was doubted from their original publication, and they are considered to be fictional by many scholars. The Teachings of Don Juan gained widespread public attention outside of anthropological circles, launching his career as a writer, being transferred from the University of California Press in 1967 to the mainstream publisher Simon and Schuster in 1968. Castaneda was awarded his bachelor's and doctoral degrees based on the work described in these books.

In 1974, his fourth book, Tales of Power, chronicled the end of the story of his apprenticeship with Matus. Despite published questions and criticism, Castaneda continued to be popular with the reading public, and subsequent publications described further aspects of his training with Don Juan.

Castaneda wrote that Don Juan recognized him as the new nagual, or leader of a party of seers of his lineage. He said Matus also used the term nagual to signify that part of perception which is in the realm of the unknown yet still reachable by man, implying that, for his party of seers, Matus was a connection to that unknown. Castaneda often referred to this unknown realm as "non-ordinary reality".

Although Castaneda was a prominent cultural figure, he rarely appeared in public forums. He was the subject of a cover article in the March 5, 1973, issue of Time, which described him as "an enigma wrapped in a mystery wrapped in a tortilla". There was controversy when it was revealed that Castaneda might have used a surrogate for his cover portrait. Correspondent Sandra Burton, apparently unaware of Castaneda's principle of freedom from personal history, confronted him about discrepancies in his account of his life. He responded: "To ask me to verify my life by giving you my statistics ... is like using science to validate sorcery. It robs the world of its magic and makes milestones out of us all." The royalties from the Don Juan books made Castaneda a wealthy man.

Castaneda's public reputation, especially among anthropologists, was severely damaged by the publication of the 1976 book Castaneda's Journey by Richard de Mille, which provided convincing evidence that Castaneda's journeys and account of Don Juan had likely been fabricated, following which the popularity of his books declined. By the mid-late 1970s, Castaneda completely retired from public view, until he returned to public speaking during the 1990s, by which time Castaneda's writings had taken on a more religious dimension and he had taken on the role of a spiritual leader to a following of devotees. Zuzana Marie Kostićová wrote in a 2022 journal article that "By the mid-80s, his transition from scholar to religious teacher, both as a writer and a leader, was complete."

=== Tensegrity ===
In the 1990s, Castaneda once again began appearing in public to promote Tensegrity, described in promotional materials as "the modernized version of some movements called magical passes developed by Indigenous shamans who lived in Mexico in times before the Spanish conquest". It has been described as "a specific physical excersise [sic] designed to manipulate with energy in the human energetic body". Castaneda, with Carol Tiggs, Florinda Donner-Grau and Taisha Abelar, created Cleargreen Incorporated in 1995, the stated purpose of which was "to sponsor Tensegrity workshops, classes and publications". Tensegrity seminars, books, and other merchandise were sold through Cleargreen.

== Personal life ==
Castaneda married Margaret Runyan in Mexico in 1960, according to Runyan's memoirs. He is listed as the father on the birth certificate of Runyan's son, C.J. Castaneda (who later took the name Adrian Vashon), even though the biological father was a different man. In an interview, Runyan said she and Castaneda were married from 1960 to 1973; however, Castaneda obscured whether the marriage occurred, and his death certificate stated he had never been married. Shortly prior to moving to America, Castaneda reportedly fathered a daughter with a partner in Lima (with some sources alleging he moved to the United States to evade responsibility for caring for her) though he had no later children and may have had a vasectomy.

== Death ==
Castaneda died on April 27, 1998 in Los Angeles at the age of 72, due to complications from hepatocellular cancer. There was no public service; he was cremated, and the ashes were sent to Mexico. His death was unknown to the outside world until nearly two months later, on June 19, 1998, when an obituary, "A Hushed Death for Mystic Author Carlos Castaneda" by staff writer J. R. Moehringer, appeared in the Los Angeles Times. Castaneda had reportedly spent the last several months of his life watching VHS tapes of war movies, the last being Stalag 17, which he apparently had a very negative opinion of. Prior to his death, his documents and records had been systematically burned by his followers. In his will Castaneda's assets were divided among his closest devotees. Adrian Vashon, Castaneda's former stepson, the son of Castaneda's ex-wife Margaret Runyan, filed a legal claim, claiming that Castaneda's devotees had changed his will shortly prior to his death to exclude him from the estate. A judge later ruled against Vashon.

== Castaneda's students ==
After Castaneda stepped away from public view in the early 1970s, he used the significant money he made from the Don Juan books to buy a large multi-dwelling property in Los Angeles, which he shared with some of his followers. From then until his death, Castaneda cultivated an inner circle of young female devotees who he called "witches" or "chacmools" (after a type of Mesoamerican statue), who were instructed to cut their hair short into a boyish cut and bathe in rosemary-infused water. Those "witches" who became part of his inner circle were also instructed to "abandon their families, destroy photos, legally change their names, and become [Castaneda]'s sexual subordinates." The "chacmools" closest to Castaneda were involved in running Cleargreen Inc., a business organization which promoted Castaneda's teachings by selling videos, workshops, and other items like t-shirts, which also served as a way to recruit new followers. Castaneda's circle of devotees has been described by some as a "cult". Notable witches/chacmools include Taisha Abelar (formerly Maryann Simko) and Florinda Donner-Grau (formerly Regine Thal). Like Castaneda, Abelar and Donner-Grau were students of anthropology at UCLA. Each subsequently wrote a book about her experiences of Castaneda's / don Juan's teachings from a female perspective: The Sorcerer's Crossing: A Woman's Journey by Taisha Abelar, and Being-in-Dreaming: An Initiation into the Sorcerers' World by Florinda Donner. Castaneda endorsed both of these books as authentic reports of the sorcery experience of Don Juan's world.

=== Disappearances ===
Around the time Castaneda died, his companions Donner-Grau, Abelar and Patricia Partin informed friends they were leaving on a long journey. Amalia Marquez (also known as Talia Bey) and Tensegrity instructor Kylie Lundahl also left Los Angeles. Weeks later, Partin's red Ford Escort was found abandoned in Death Valley. Luis Marquez, Bey's brother, went to the police in 1999 over his sister's disappearance, but could not convince them that it merited investigation.

In 2003, Partin's sun-bleached skeleton was discovered by a pair of hikers in Death Valley's Panamint Dunes area, and identified in 2006 by DNA testing. The investigating authorities ruled the cause of death as undetermined. However, Castaneda often talked about suicide, and associates believe the women killed themselves in the wake of Castaneda's death. As of 2024, none of the other four missing "witches" have been heard from since their disappearance and their fates remain undetermined. Some of Castaneda's followers have speculated that they may have ritually committed suicide as an attempt to follow Castaneda into the afterlife, as Castaneda preached that by using shamanic practices one could cheat death by transferring their energy into an "alternate dimension".

== Themes ==
While Castaneda's early works, particularly The Teachings of Don Juan, emphasized the use of psychoactive drugs such as peyote, Datura, and magic mushrooms to achieve spiritual knowledge via altering perception of reality (contemporaneous with the widespread countercultural use of psychedelics in the United States during the late 1960s when the book was published), his later books tended to avoid mentioning this, focusing on other means to achieve altered states of consciousness. Castaneda's early works tend to emphasise the idea that there is no one "true" interpretation of reality and that its nature is up for interpretation, with the character of Don Juan ridiculing Castaneda for asking for definitive answers about the nature of reality. However, in his later works towards the end of his life, Castaneda attempts to explain the true nature of reality, describing reality as being composed of an "extensive web of energy that emanates from the central source" known as "the Eagle", focusing on the practice of lucid dreaming as well as "stalking" (changing one's personality, environment, and/or habitual behaviour, etc).

== Reception ==
The veracity of these books and the existence of Don Juan were doubted from their original publication, and there is now consensus among critics and scholars that the books are largely, if not completely, fictional. Castaneda's later, more religiously-oriented works that attempt to provide an explanation for the nature of reality (rather than leaving the nature of things he experienced unexplained as is typical of his early works) are much less commentated on by scholars, though they are much more influential among modern Castaneda devotees than his earlier, more widely known works. Castaneda's works have been noted as an influence on neoshamanism and the broader New Age movement.

=== Early responses ===
In the early years following the 1968 publication of Castaneda's first book, The Teachings of Don Juan: A Yaqui Way of Knowledge, there was considerable positive coverage and interest in his work. The New York Times published a review that praised the book's captivating storytelling and its portrayal of Don Juan as a "remarkable, almost legendary figure". In 1971, Life included a review of A Separate Reality, describing the book as "breathtaking" and focusing on the intrigue of his shamanic journey. The Saturday Review highlighted the vividness of Castaneda's descriptions and his portrayal of Don Juan's teachings as thought-provoking and transformative. The Los Angeles Times reviewed the book positively, emphasizing its impact on readers and its exploration of consciousness and reality. The Guardian's review of the book acknowledged Castaneda's skill as a writer and his ability to create a sense of immersion in his narrative. Time Magazine ran a feature article on Castaneda in 1973, which acknowledged the controversy and skepticism surrounding Castaneda's account but highlighted the book's allure, describing it as "an extraordinary narrative".

=== Later responses ===
Concerns about the authenticity of Castaneda's work have existed since its initial publication, despite reviewers praising its writing and storytelling. For example, while Edmund Leach praised The Teachings of Don Juan as "a work of art," he doubted its factual authenticity. Anthropologist E. H. Spicer offered a somewhat mixed review of the book, highlighting Castaneda's expressive prose and his vivid depiction of his relationship with don Juan. However, Spicer noted that the events described in the book were not consistent with other ethnographic accounts of Yaqui cultural practices, concluding it was unlikely that don Juan had ever participated in Yaqui group life. Spicer also wrote, "[It is] wholly gratuitous to emphasize, as the subtitle does, any connection between the subject matter of the book and the cultural traditions of the Yaquis."

In a series of articles, R. Gordon Wasson, the ethnobotanist who made psychoactive mushrooms famous, similarly praised Castaneda's work, while expressing doubts about its accuracy.

An early unpublished review by anthropologist Weston La Barre was more critical and questioned the book's accuracy. The review, initially commissioned by The New York Times Book Review, was rejected and replaced by a more positive review from anthropologist Paul Riesman.

Beginning in 1976, Richard de Mille published a series of criticisms that uncovered inconsistencies in Castaneda's field notes, as well as 47 pages of apparently plagiarized quotes.

Those familiar with Yaqui culture also questioned Castaneda's accounts, including anthropologist Jane Holden Kelley. Other criticisms of Castaneda's work include the total lack of Yaqui vocabulary or terms for any of his experiences, and his refusal to defend himself against the accusation that he received his PhD from UCLA through deception.

=== Modern perspectives ===
According to William W. Kelly, chair of the anthropology department at Yale University:

I doubt you'll find an anthropologist of my generation who regards Castaneda as anything but a clever con man. It was a hoax, and surely Don Juan never existed as anything like the figure of his books. Perhaps to many it is an amusing footnote to the gullibility of naive scholars, although to me it remains a disturbing and unforgivable breach of ethics.

Sociologist David Silverman sees value in the work even while considering it fictional. In Reading Castaneda, he describes the apparent deception as a critique of anthropology field work in general—a field that relies heavily on personal experience, and necessarily views other cultures through a lens. He said that the descriptions of peyote trips and the work's fictional nature were meant to place doubt on other works of anthropology.

Donald Wiebe cites Castaneda to explain the insider/outsider problem as it relates to mystical experiences, while acknowledging the fictional nature of Castaneda's work.

=== Existence of Don Juan Matus ===
Although there was initial debate "whether Castaneda served as an apprentice to the alleged Yaqui sorcerer don Juan Matus or if he invented the whole odyssey", there is today a strong consensus among critics that they are largely, if not completely, fictional. Castaneda's writings of the teachings of Don Juan wildly contradict what is known of actual Yaqui culture.

Castaneda critic Richard de Mille published two books—Castaneda's Journey: The Power and the Allegory and The Don Juan Papers—in which he argued that Don Juan was imaginary, based on several arguments, including that Castaneda did not report on the Yaqui name of a single plant he learned about, and that he and Don Juan "go quite unmolested by pests that normally torment desert hikers." The Don Juan Papers also includes 47 pages of quotes Castaneda attributed to Don Juan, which were actually from a variety of other sources, including anthropological journal articles and even well-known writers including Ludwig Wittgenstein and C. S. Lewis. In response, Castaneda was defended in a letter to the editor by the inventor of Core Shamanism, Michael Harner. Walter Shelburne contends that "the Don Juan chronicle cannot be a true account."

According to Jeroen Boekhoven, Castaneda spent some time with Ramón Medina Silva, a Huichol mara'akame (shaman) and artist who may have inspired the Don Juan character. Silva was murdered during a brawl in 1971.

== Related writers and influence ==
- Michael Korda, editor-in-chief at Simon & Schuster, was Castaneda's editor for his first eight books and discusses their work together in an essay in Another Life: A Memoir of Other People.
- George Lucas has stated that Yoda and Luke Skywalker were inspired in part by Don Juan and Castaneda.
- Octavio Paz, Nobel laureate, poet, and diplomat, wrote the prologue to the Spanish-language edition of The Teachings of Don Juan.
- Amy Wallace wrote Sorcerer's Apprentice: My Life with Carlos Castaneda, an account of her personal experiences with Castaneda and his followers.

== Publications ==
=== Books ===
- The Teachings of Don Juan: A Yaqui Way of Knowledge, 1968. ISBN 978-0-520-21757-7. (Summer 1960 to October 1965.)
- A Separate Reality: Further Conversations with Don Juan, 1971. ISBN 978-0-671-73249-3. (April 1968 to October 1970.)
- Journey to Ixtlan: The Lessons of Don Juan, 1972. ISBN 978-0-671-73246-2. (Summer 1960 to May 1971.)
- Tales of Power, 1974. ISBN 978-0-671-73252-3. (Autumn 1971 to the 'Final Meeting' with don Juan Matus in 1973.)
- The Second Ring of Power, 1977. ISBN 978-0-671-73247-9. (Meeting his fellow apprentices after the 'Final Meeting'.)
- The Eagle's Gift, 1981. ISBN 978-0-671-73251-6. (Continuing with his fellow apprentices, and then alone with La Gorda.)
- The Fire From Within, 1984. ISBN 978-0-671-73250-9. (Don Juan's 'Second Attention' teachings through to the 'Final Meeting' in 1973.)
- The Power of Silence: Further Lessons of Don Juan, 1987. ISBN 978-0-671-73248-6. (The 'Abstract Cores' of Don Juan's lessons.)
- The Art of Dreaming, 1993. ISBN 978-0-06-092554-3. (Review of don Juan's lessons in dreaming.)
- Magical Passes: The Practical Wisdom of the Shamans of Ancient Mexico, 1998. ISBN 978-0-06-017584-9. (Body movements for breaking the barriers of normal perception.)
- The Wheel of Time: Shamans of Ancient Mexico, Their Thoughts About Life, Death and the Universe, 1998. ISBN 978-0-9664116-0-7. (Selected quotations from the first eight books.)
- The Active Side of Infinity, 1999. ISBN 978-0-06-019220-4. (Memorable events of his life.)

=== Interviews ===
- Burton, Sandra (March 5, 1973). "Magic and Reality". Time.
- Corvalan, Graciela, Der Weg der Tolteken - Ein Gespräch mit Carlos Castañeda, Fischer, 1987, c. 100p., ISBN 3-596-23864-1

== See also ==
- Body of light
- Peyote song
- Rainbow body
- Witchcraft in Latin America
