= Oliver Fox (writer) =

British writer (1885–1949)

- Oliver Fox
- Born: Oliver Fox; 30 November 1885
- Died: 28 April 1949 (aged 63)
- Occupations: Writer, journalist
- Writing career
- Period: 20th century
- Genre: Parapsychology

Oliver Fox was the pseudonym of Hugh George Callaway (30 November 1885 – 28 April 1949), an English short story writer, poet and occultist, most well known for documenting his experiences in astral projection and lucid dreaming.

Fox had trained in electrical engineering and worked as an actor and a writer of fiction for magazines. He had first published his OBE experiences in The Occult Review (1920, 1923). These formed the basis of his book Astral Projection: A Record of Out-of-the-Body Experiences, published in 1939.

Fox has been described as a theosophist.

== Publications ==
- Fox, Oliver (1920). The Pineal Doorway: A Record of Research. The Occult Review 31: 190–198.
- Fox, Oliver. (1920). Beyond the Pineal Door: A Record of Research. The Occult Review 31: 251–261.
- Fox, Oliver. (1923). Dream-travelling: Some Additional Notes. The Occult Review 38: 332–338.
- Fox, Oliver. (1962 edition, originally published in 1939). Astral Projection: A Record of Out-of-the-Body Experiences. University Books.
