= Sylvan Muldoon =

American writer (1903–1969)

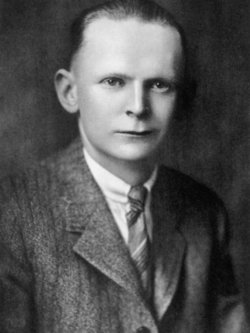
- Born: Sylvan Muldoon; February 18, 1903; Darlington, Lafayette County, Wisconsin, US
- Died: October 15, 1969 (aged 66); Darlington, Lafayette County, Wisconsin, US
- Occupation: Writer

Sylvan Muldoon (February 18, 1903 – October 15, 1969) was an American esotericist who promoted the concept of astral projection. According to Muldoon, astral projection is an out-of-body experience (OBE) that assumes the existence of an astral body separate from the physical body and is capable of travelling outside it.

== Early life and experiences ==
Muldoon was born in Darlington, Wisconsin, and was the second child of his parents Henry F. Muldoon and Mattie Muldoon (née Harvey) whose siblings were Harry Harvey Muldoon, Frank Lyman Muldoon and Lynn Muldoon.

In 1915, when he was 12 years old, Muldoon was said to have experienced his first OBE while at a Spiritualist camp in Clinton, Iowa with his mother that made him believe he had died.

By 1927, Muldoon, as an earlier pioneer in the OBE field, was collaborating with the well-known British-born American investigator of psychic phenomena and author Hereward Carrington writing three books on OBE's, the most popular being their 1951 collaboration The Phenomena of Astral Projection.

In his 1929 book, The Projection of the Astral Body, Muldoon wrote that he, twenty-five at the time, had projected hundreds of times. He described two main methods for projection: the "passive-will" method and the "dream-control" method. He argued that the astral body rises out of coincidence with the physical body when we fall asleep.

Dream researcher Jayne Gackenbach and psychophysiologist Stephen LaBerge have compared Muldoon's OBE experiences to lucid dreaming.

== Theories used by L. Ron Hubbard ==
In 2012, Princeton University Press named Ohio State University professor Hugh Urban's book on the Church of Scientology as one of their most outstanding academic titles for the year, and wherein Urban asserted that L. Ron Hubbard had adopted many of Muldoon's theories as his own and stated that Hubbard's description of exteriorizing the thetan is extremely similar if not identical to the descriptions of astral projection in occult literature popularized by Muldoon's widely read Phenomena of Astral Projection (1951) and Muldoon's description of the astral body as being connected to the physical body by a long thin, elastic cord that is virtually identical to the one described in Hubbard's "Excalibur" vision.

== Death ==
Muldoon died in 1969 and was buried in Union Grove Cemetery, Darlington, Wisconsin.

== Bibliography ==
- The Projection of the Astral Body (1929) co-written with Hereward Carrington
- The Case for Astral Projection: Hallucination or Reality! (1936)
- Sensational Psychical Experiences (1941)
- Famous Psychic Stories (1942)
- Psychic Experiences of Famous People (1947)
- The Phenomena of Astral Projection (1951) co-written with Hereward Carrington
