= Florinda Donner =

American writer and anthropologist

- Born: Regine Margarita Thal; 1944
- Disappeared: 1998
- Other names: Florinda Donner-Grau
- Occupation: writer
- Notable work: Shabono; The Witch's Dream; Being-in-Dreaming

Florinda Donner (originally Regine Margarita Thal, later Florinda Donner-Grau) is an American writer and anthropologist known as one of Carlos Castaneda's "witches" (the term for three women who were friends of Castaneda). She disappeared shortly after Castaneda's death in April 1998.

== Early life ==
Donner was born Regine Margarita Thal in Amberg, Bavaria, in Germany on February 15, 1944, to parents Rudolf Thal and Katarina Claussnitzer, who in 1946 migrated to Venezuela when Donner was a child.

She studied anthropology, gaining a bachelor's degree at the University of California, Los Angeles (UCLA), in 1972, and a master's degree in 1972. She did not complete her post-graduate degree, letting her graduate studies lapse in 1977, after having advanced to doctoral candidacy. While studying, she met Castaneda and worked with him on developing his thinking.

== Writing ==
In addition to working on Castaneda's books, she wrote several books about indigenous healing, sorcery and lucid dreaming.

=== Shabono controversy ===
In 1982, Florinda Donner published a book, Shabono: A Visit to a Remote and Magical World in the South American Rain Forest, a narrative of living among the Yanomami Indians in the Venezuelan Amazon rainforest. The title is the Yanomami word for shelter, shabono.

Though the book was initially praised as a compelling account of Yanomami culture, in 1983 controversy broke out when an article in American Anthropologist accused the book of not being based on original ethnographic work, but instead being a patchwork made of previously published ethnographic accounts. Rebecca De Holmes, the author of the critique, stated that it was unlikely that Donner had spent any amount of time among the Yanomami. Particularly, she criticized Donner for having plagiarized the biographical account of the Brazilian woman Helena Valero, who grew up as a captive among the Yanomami, without acknowledging having borrowed large parts of her life story. Another critical review, by Dr. Debra Picchi, argues that the book was invalid as social science because of the author's autobiographical focus on her personal development and experience, rather than on describing the Yanomami people. One critic suspected that Donner had worked from the many ethnographic movies about the Yanomami and argued that in that case her book could be considered an interpretive study of the visual documentary data.

The validity of De Holmes' critique was largely accepted by the anthropological community. Even though Donner did not anywhere claim that her book was based on having actually lived among the Yanomami, she was roundly criticized for having used the ethnographic writing genre without her work in fact being based on anthropological methods. Eventually her former doctoral committee at UCLA published a letter in the Newsletter of the American Anthropological Association, in which they expressed their disbelief in Donner's account, stating that she was present in Los Angeles during the period in which she supposedly lived among the Yanomami. When the book was published they were not aware that the author was their former student, as she had changed her name in the meantime.

Some scholars later wondered why her book was criticized for being unscientific, even though it never made any explicit claims to scientific authority. Combined with the controversy generated by the writings of Carlos Castañeda, the controversy about Donner's book contributed to sparking the ethnography "crisis of representation" of the 1980s, represented by the "Writing Culture" movement. The book is now generally considered "anthropologically-inspired fiction".

== Disappearance ==
After the death of her mentor Carlos Castaneda in 1998, Florinda and four other women who followed Castaneda disappeared from Los Angeles, California. One of the women's bodies, Patricia Lee Partin, was discovered in Death Valley in 2003, but the location of the rest remains a mystery. The last time Florinda was seen was the day after Castaneda's death.

== Works ==
- Shabono: A Visit to a Remote and Magical World in the South American Rain Forest. Delacorte Press. 1982. ISBN 978-0-440-07828-9.
- The Witch's Dream: A Healer's Way of Knowledge. Simon & Schuster. 1985. ISBN 978-0-671-55198-8.
- Being-in-Dreaming: An Initiation Into the Sorcerers' World. Harper Collins. 1992. ISBN 978-0-06-250192-9.

== See also ==
- List of people who disappeared mysteriously: post-1970
