= Inner space (science fiction) =

Antonym to "outer space"

Inner space in the context of science fiction refers to works of psychological science fiction that emphasize internal, mental, and emotional experiences over external adventure or technological speculation, which contrasts with traditional science fiction's fascination with outer space.

Works from this genre appeared as part of the emergence of the New Wave in science fiction in the 1960s. They were popularized by English writer J. G. Ballard and associated with the New Wave movement in science fiction. Subsequent contributions by critics and writers such as Michael Moorcock, Pat Cadigan, and Greg Bear helped establish inner space as a recurring theme in science fiction discourse.

== Characteristics ==
English writer J. G. Ballard, who is credited with popularizing the concept in the 1960s, offered this definition of the inner space genre: "an imaginary realm in which on the one hand the outer world of reality, and on the other the inner world of the mind meet and merge".

Polish science fiction scholars Andrzej Niewiadowski and Antoni Smuszkiewicz defined inner space as "a category introduced to science fiction by representatives of the New Wave to designate internal, mental experiences as imaginary worlds with no connection to the real world". They also note that "fantastic images painted by [New Wave artists] are... projections of mental states, symbols of unspecified longings and anxieties of modern people."

German science fiction scholar Vera Graaf wrote that inner space "is a polemical statement against the science fiction concept of 'Outer space' — the cosmos". She notes that this genre arose when some writers became critical of poorly defined heroic characters and "romantic idealization of the cosmic 'borderland'". She further writes that "It is a space of imagination where the external real world and the internal world of the spirit meet and merge into one," and the authors who are associated with that genre are "fascinated by the observation and deciphering of the 'inner universe' and 'landscapes of the soul'". She also writes that this genre, "unlike traditional science fiction, which highlights mathematical and natural sciences, brings psychology and psychoanalysis to the fore". She associates the resulting works with "the world of psychedelic experiences, the world of 'pop' music and art".

This concept is related to but not synonymous with the concept of psychological science fiction. The term inner space in science fiction is also used in contexts other than psychological ones, including in works about cyberspace or underwater regions.

== History ==
According to John Clute, David Langford, and Peter Nicholls, writing in The Encyclopedia of Science Fiction, in the context of science fiction the term was probably first used by Robert Bloch in a speech at Worldcon in 1948, although the term did not gain popularity at that time. Clute, Langford, and Nicholls, as well as Brian M. Stableford, also observe that the term was subsequently popularized by J. B. Priestley in the article "They Came from Inner Space" (New Statesman, 1954). In this article, Priestley criticized science fiction for describing space adventures rather than exploring the inner cosmos of human psychology, referring to themes such as space travel and exploration as "childish". He called for works that are "exploring ourselves, the hidden life of the psyche". Stableford also noted that the growing popularity of the term may have been a reaction to the popularity of works using the term "outer space", such as the film It Came from Outer Space (1953).

Most often, however, it is J. G. Ballard who is credited with popularizing this concept and giving it greater meaning. Don D'Ammassa even credited Ballard with creating the concept. Ballard was a leading figure associated with the New Wave in science fiction. In his article "Which Way to Inner Space?" (New Worlds, 1962), he followed in Priestley's footsteps by postulating, as Dominika Oramus later summarized it, that creators of "ambitious science fiction should abandon repetitive space stories and investigate the inner space of the human mind".

The term became popular in the work of New Wave writers in the mid-1960s. Ballard and Michael Moorcock are often credited as major figures related to this development. One of the first works to refer to this concept by name was a short story by Howard Koch, "Invasion from Inner Space" (1959), although critics disagree whether Koch's story about the psychology of artificial intelligence, and subsequent works about cyberspace, reflect the dimension of human psychological problems described by Priestley and Ballard.

Brian Ash noted that science fiction works dealing with psychological topics existed before the concept was coined and popular. The earliest example he points to is H. G. Wells' novel Mr. Blettsworthy on Rampole Island (1928), describing it as a "prototype inner-space [story]". Rob Mayo traces the genre origins to Peter Phillipps' short story "Dreams Are Sacred" (1948), a work which pioneered the science fiction trope of "dream hacking" and has been described as an example of "technologically assisted journeys into the hypothetical Inner Space of the human mind". Mayo posits that proto-inner space themes existed prior to Peter Phillip's work, including the medieval genre of psychomachia (named after the poem of the same name) which deals with the soul of an individual (acting analogous to the function of the mind in the genre). As well, the mechanics of Gottfried Wilhelm Leibniz's "mill argument" pointing towards the mathematics of entering inside a working mind as if it were physical space.

Rob Mayo wrote that the 1980s was the second "golden age" of inner space, associated with writers such as Pat Cadigan and Greg Bear; he also notes the movie Dreamscape (1984), which he calls "the first inner space film". He notes that the genre once again returned the 2000s, here noting the movies The Cell (2000) and Inception (2010), as well as the video game Psychonauts (2005). He notes that Inception marked "the transition of inner space fiction from a marginal genre (SF literature) to a viable mainstream (Hollywood cinema)".

== Representative writers ==
Writers whose works are often associated with the inner space genre include:

- Brian W. Aldiss
- J. G. Ballard
- Barrington J. Bayley
- Greg Bear
- John Brunner
- Pat Cadigan
- Philip K. Dick
- Thomas M. Disch
- Harlan Ellison
- Philip José Farmer
- Ursula K. Le Guin
- Doris Lessing
- Michael Moorcock
- Christopher Priest
- Robert Silverberg
- John T. Sladek
- Norman Spinrad
- James Tiptree Jr.
- Roger Zelazny

== See also ==
- Innerspace, a 1987 American science fiction comedy film
