= December 1925 =

Month of 1925

<<	December 1925					>>
Su	Mo	Tu	We	Th	Fr	Sa
		1	2	3	4	5
6	7	8	9	10	11	12
13	14	15	16	17	18	19
20	21	22	23	24	25	26
27	28	29	30	31

The following events occurred in December 1925:

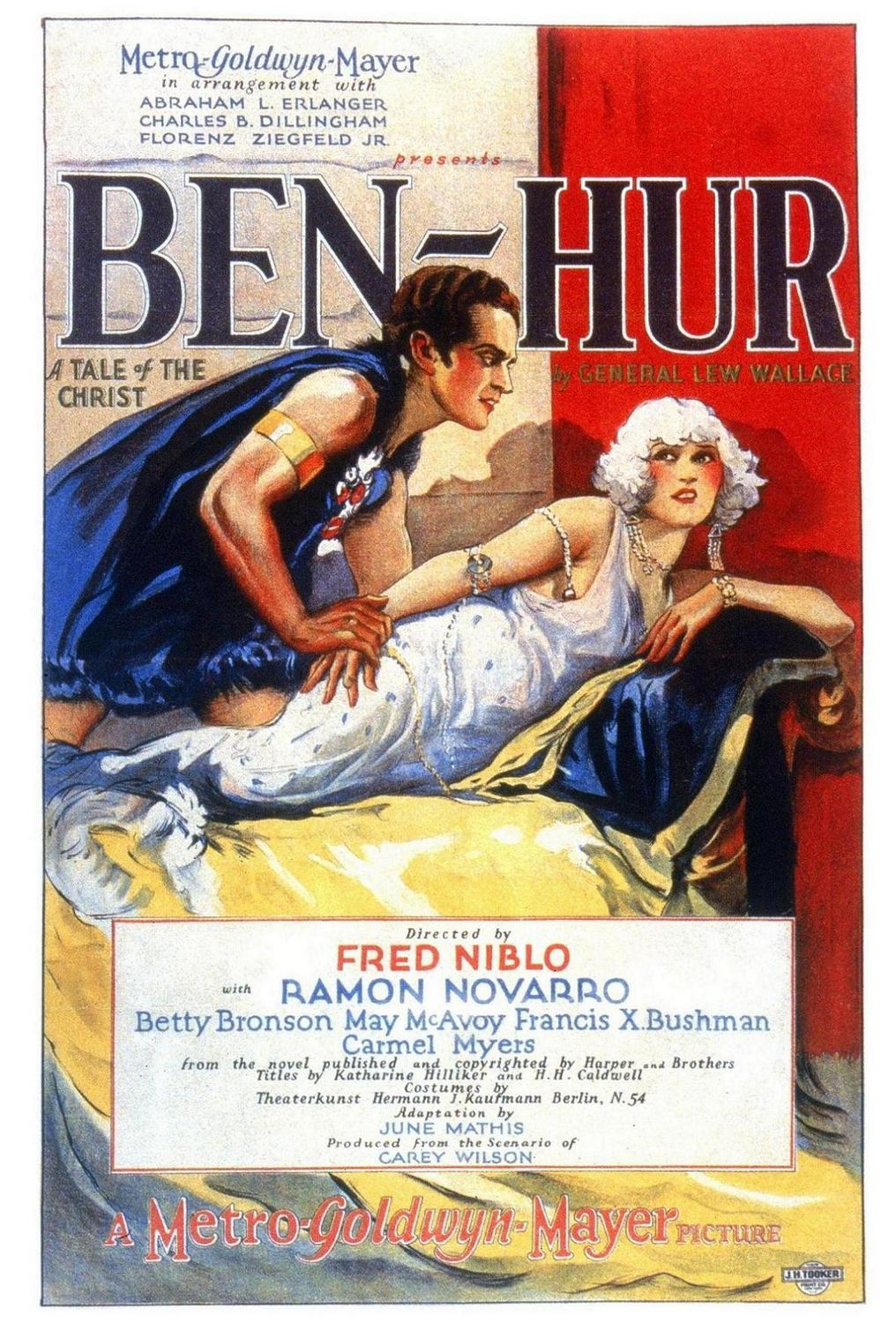
December 30, 1925: Ben-Hur premieres in the United States

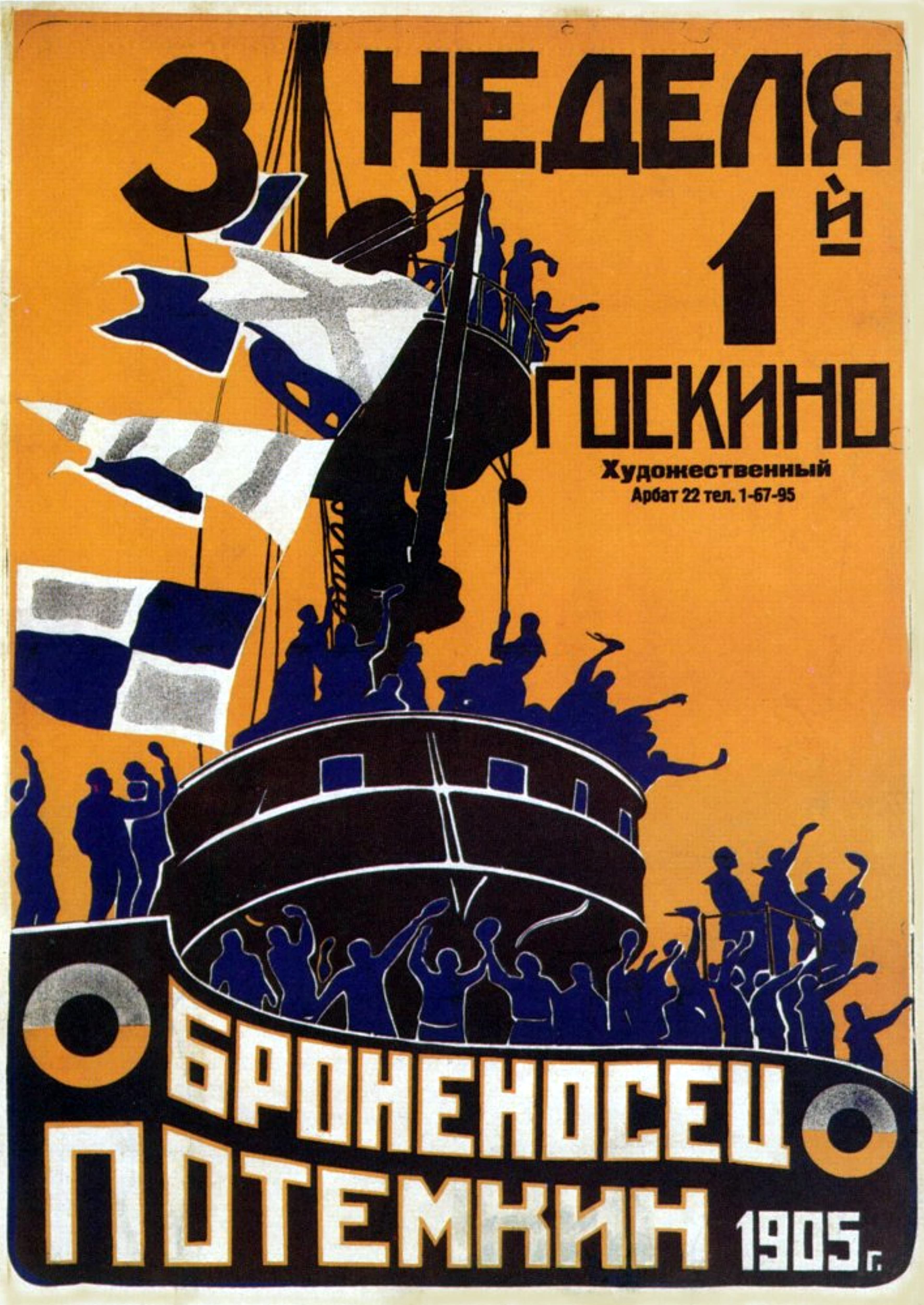
December 21, 1925: Battleship Potemkin premieres in the Soviet Union

== December 1, 1925 (Tuesday) ==
- The Locarno Treaties were formally signed in London, intended to secure the post-war continental European territorial settlement.
- European delegates also agreed that troops engaging in the Occupation of the Rhineland would be greatly reduced on January 31, 1926.
- Voting for President was held in Bolivia after the May 2 results had been annulled. Hernando Siles Reyes was elected President, winning 97% of the vote against token opposition from Daniel Salamanca by, who officially received only 1,937 of the 72,549 votes cast. After Siles had completed his term, Salamanca would win the 1931 election.
- The Farmer-Labour Party was founded in Japan and dissolved two hours later upon orders from the government which claimed they had a secret communist agenda.
- The Stanley Baldwin government survived a vote of censure condemning a recent wave of arrests of communists on offences under the Incitement to Mutiny Act 1797 as a violation of free speech rights.
- France negotiated separate treaties with Poland and Czechoslovakia pledging mutual assistance in the event of an attack by Germany on any of the signatories.
- Born:
  - Martin Rodbell, American biochemist and 1994 Nobel Prize recipient for his discovery of G-proteins and their role in signal transduction in cells with Alfred G. Gilman; in Baltimore, United States (d. 1998)
  - Lou Filippo, American professional boxer, judge and actor known for portraying a fight referee in seven films, including the first five in the Rocky film franchise; in Los Angeles, United States (d. 2009)
  - Ichirō Hariu, Japanese art critic; in Sendai, Miyagi Prefecture, Empire of Japan (present-day Japan) (d. 2010)
- Died: Ray Cariens, 25, American racing driver; died two days after being injured at the 11th and final scheduled race for the 1925 AAA Championship Car season (b. 1899)

== December 2, 1925 (Wednesday) ==
- The German chemical company IG Farben was founded by a merger of six chemical companies (Agfa, BASF, Bayer, Griesheim-Elektron, Hoechst, and Weiler-ter-Meer) following an agreement reached on November 21.
- The first contract for oil drilling in the Kingdom of Bahrain was signed by Britain's Eastern and General Syndicate and the Sheik of Bahrain for an exclusive concession to develop, explore and drill for oil in an area of 100,000 acres 156.25 square miles (404.7 km^{2}).
- The first National Hockey League game to ever take place in Pittsburgh was played at the Duquesne Garden as the hometown Pittsburgh Pirates lost to their fellow expansion team the New York Americans, 2 to 1, in overtime.
- Tod Morgan won the World Junior Lightweight boxing championship at the Olympic Auditorium in Los Angeles with a TKO in the 10th round over Mike Ballerino, who had held the title since April 1.
- Born:
  - Mike Colalillo, U.S. Army soldier and Medal of Honor recipient for heroism in battle during World War II; in Hibbing, Minnesota, United States (d. 2011)
  - Julie Harris, American actress; in Grosse Point, Michigan, United States (d. 2013)
  - Bette Swenson Orsini, American investigative reporter for the St. Petersburg Times and 1980 Pulitzer Prize winner for her series about the Church of Scientology; in St. Petersburg, Florida, United States (d. 2011)

== December 3, 1925 (Thursday) ==
- The Northern Irish Border Agreement was signed by representatives of Northern Ireland (Sir James Craig), the Irish Free State (W. T. Cosgrave) and Great Britain (Stanley Baldwin), and delineating the border between Northern Ireland and Ireland. Though the initial recommendations of the Irish Boundary Commission would have made transfers of land between the two states in Ireland, with 286 square miles (740 km^{2}) of the Republic's County Donegal being transferred to Northern Ireland and 77 square miles (200 km^{2}) in and around the Northern Irish city of Derry being ceded to the Republic, the final boundary remained unchanged.
- A Romanian Army court-martial convicted 84 participants in the 1924 Tatarbunary Uprising, nearly all of them Moldavians rather than Romanians, of attempting to overthrow the government, and meted out sentences ranging from 1 to 3 years in prison for most conspirators, 23 prisoners from 5 to 10 years, two to 15 years and the uprising leader, Iustin Batishcev to life imprisonment.
- Spain's Prime Minister Miguel Primo de Rivera, who had overthrown the government of Spain in 1923 in a military coup d'état, made the first step toward transition to a civilian government.
- The George Gershwin composition "Concerto in F" was performed for the first time, premiering at Carnegie Hall with Walter Damrosch conducting and Gershwin at piano.
- Died: John McAlery, 77, Irish association football pioneer known for the first organized match in Ireland in 1878 and the first semi-professional team in 1879, and co-founder of the Irish Football Association in 1880 (b. 1848)

== December 4, 1925 (Friday) ==
- The Central Casting Corporation was established in Hollywood, California by Will H. Hays and the Motion Picture Producers and Distributors of America to regulate the casting of extras in films.
- Tipped off by an alert bank teller, the Banco de Portugal discovered the fraud and counterfeiting of the Portuguese escudo masterminded by the wealthy entrepreneur Artur Virgílio Alves Reis.
- The Armenian Orphan Rug was formally gifted to U.S. President Calvin Coolidge in recognition of U.S. humanitarian assistance following the Armenian genocide.
- The Italian Chamber of Deputies passed a law allowing the government to regulate rates of industrial production based on the needs of the country.
- Born: Lino Lacedelli, Italian mountaineer; in Cortina d'Ampezzo, Kingdom of Italy (present-day Italy) (d. 2009)

== December 5, 1925 (Saturday) ==
- The 13th Grey Cup of Canadian football was played before 6,900 fans at the Lansdowne Park at Ottawa. The Ottawa Senators beat the Winnipeg Tammany Tigers, 24 to 1.
- The historic city of Medina, formerly part of the Kingdom of Hejaz, capitulated to the forces of the Sultan Ibn Saud of Nejd without resistance.
- The portrait of Saint Teresa of Ávila, painted by Peter Paul Rubens in 1614, was found in Berlin after being missing for more than 200 years. A German art historian, Dr. Ludwig Burchard, discovered the lost painting in Belgium and its authenticity was confirmed by Professor Wilhelm von Bode.
- The sensationalized Kip Rhinelander divorce trial ended with the jury ruling in Mrs. Rhinelander's favour.
- Born:
  - Keith Reemtsma, American transplant surgeon known for performing the first successful cross-species kidney transplantation where he transplanted a kidney from a chimpanzee into a human in 1964; in Madera, California, United States (d. 2000)
  - Nurnaningsih, Indonesian film actress and model; as Raden Nganten Nurnaningsih, in Surabaya, Dutch East Indies (present-day Indonesia) (d. 2004)
  - Edmundo Arias, Colombian musician and songwriter of tropical music hits; in Tuluá, Colombia (d. 1993)
  - Sidney Michaelson, English-born Scottish computer scientist and Biblical scholar; in London, England (d. 1991)
- Died: Władysław Reymont, 58, Polish writer and Nobel Prize in Literature laureate for his four-volume novel The Peasants (b. 1867)

== December 6, 1925 (Sunday) ==
- The Milner-Schialoja Agreement between the United Kingdom and Italy redrew the border between Egypt and Italian Libya, transferring Jaghbub to Italian control.
- Voting was held in Costa Rica for 21 of the 43 seats of the unicameral Constitutional Congress. The Partido Republicano, led by President Ricardo Jiménez Oreamuno, won 15 of the contested seats for 26 overall in the Congress, and the Partido Agricola won four, a total of 8 overall. The Reformist Party won 2, for 6 overall.
- Voting was held among eligible members of the Jewish community in British Mandate for Palestine for the Asefat HaNivharim, an Assembly of Representatives that was the predecessor to the Knesset of modern Israel, with candidates from 25 parties vying for the 221 available seats. The Ahdut HaAvoda Party, led by future Israeli Prime Minister David Ben-Gurion, won 54 seats (down from 70), and the Hapoel Hatzair party of Yosef Sprinzak won 30 seats (down from 41).
- In what was billed by the U.S. press as the championship of the National Football League, the Pottsville Maroons visited the Chicago Cardinals in a game at Comiskey Park before 6,000 fans. As the Chicago Sunday Tribune described the meeting, "A victory for either team carries the national title, for the Cardinals have swept over all opposition in the western half of the league, while the Pottsville eleven holds the eastern crown." The meeting was further described as "a post-season contest to decide the championship," although the paper added that "the Cardinals could claim the title without meeting Pottsville" based on their regular season schedules. Going into the game, the Cardinals had a record of 10-1-1 (ten wins, one loss, one tie) and the Maroons were 9–2–0. The Pottsville Maroons won the game, 21 to 7, but soon made a mistake that cost them the chance of being crowned the NFL champion.
- Born:
  - Andy Robustelli, American professional football player and NFL defensive end, inducted in the Pro Football Hall of Fame in 1971; as Andrew Robustelli, in Stamford, Connecticut, United States (d. 2011)
  - Shigeko Higashikuni, member of Japanese royalty and the eldest daughter of Crown Prince Hirohito; as Shigeko, Princess Teru, at Akasaka Palace, Tokyo, Empire of Japan (present-day Japan) (d. 1961)

== December 7, 1925 (Monday) ==
- Republican U.S. Congressman Nicholas Longworth of Ohio was elected as the new Speaker of the United States House of Representatives to replace the retired Frederick H. Gillett of Massachusetts, who had served since 1919. In a vote along party lines, Longworth defeated Democrat Finis J. Garrett of Tennessee, 229 to 173. A group of 13 Republicans voted for a rival candidate Henry Allen Cooper of Wisconsin, while five others cast no vote at all.
- Italian-born U.S. boxer Rocky Kansas (ring name for Rocco Tazzo) defeated Jimmy Goodrich in the second round to win the world lightweight boxing championship. Goodrich had held the title for less than five months before losing to Kansas on a technical knockout in a bout at Broadway Auditorium.
- What is now the Samuel J. Friedman Theatre on Broadway in New York City opened on 47th Street in Manhattan as the Biltmore Theatre.
- Born:
  - J. David Singer, American political scientist known for developing the Correlates of War project starting in 1964; in New York City, United States (d. 2009)
  - Lucille Kailer, American opera soprano; in Oconomowoc, Wisconsin, United States (d. 2011)

== December 8, 1925 (Tuesday) ==
- U.S. President Calvin Coolidge transmitted his third State of the Union address to be read aloud to the Congress, stating that "in the fundamentals of government and business the results demonstrate that we are going in the right direction. The country does not appear to require radical departures from the policies already adopted so much as it needs a further extension of these policies and the improvement of details."
- In Alexandria, Cyril IX Moghabghab was installed as the leader of the Melkite Greek Catholic Church as the Patriarch of Antioch and All the East, and Alexandria and Jerusalem, succeeding Demetrius I Qadi, who had died in October. Cyril IX would lead the Church until his death in 1947.
- The comedic stage musical The Cocoanuts, written by George S. Kaufman and Irving Berlin for the Marx Brothers, opened on Broadway.at the Lyric Theatre.
- Born:
  - Sammy Davis Jr., African American singer, actor, dancer, and comedian; as Samuel Davis Jr., in Harlem, New York City, United States (d. 1990)
  - Arnaldo Forlani, Italian politician, served as the Prime Minister of Italy from for eight months in 1980 and 1981; in Pesaro, Kingdom of Italy (present-day Italy) (d. 2023)
  - Carmen Martín Gaite, Spanish novelist known for Entre visillos (Behind the Curtains); in Salamanca, Spain (d. 2000)
  - Hank Thompson, American professional baseball player known for being the first African American player on the St. Louis Browns (now the Baltimore Orioles); as Henry Thompson, in Oklahoma City, Oklahoma, United States (d. 1969)
- Died: Marguerite Marsh, 37, American film actress (b. 1888)

== December 9, 1925 (Wednesday) ==
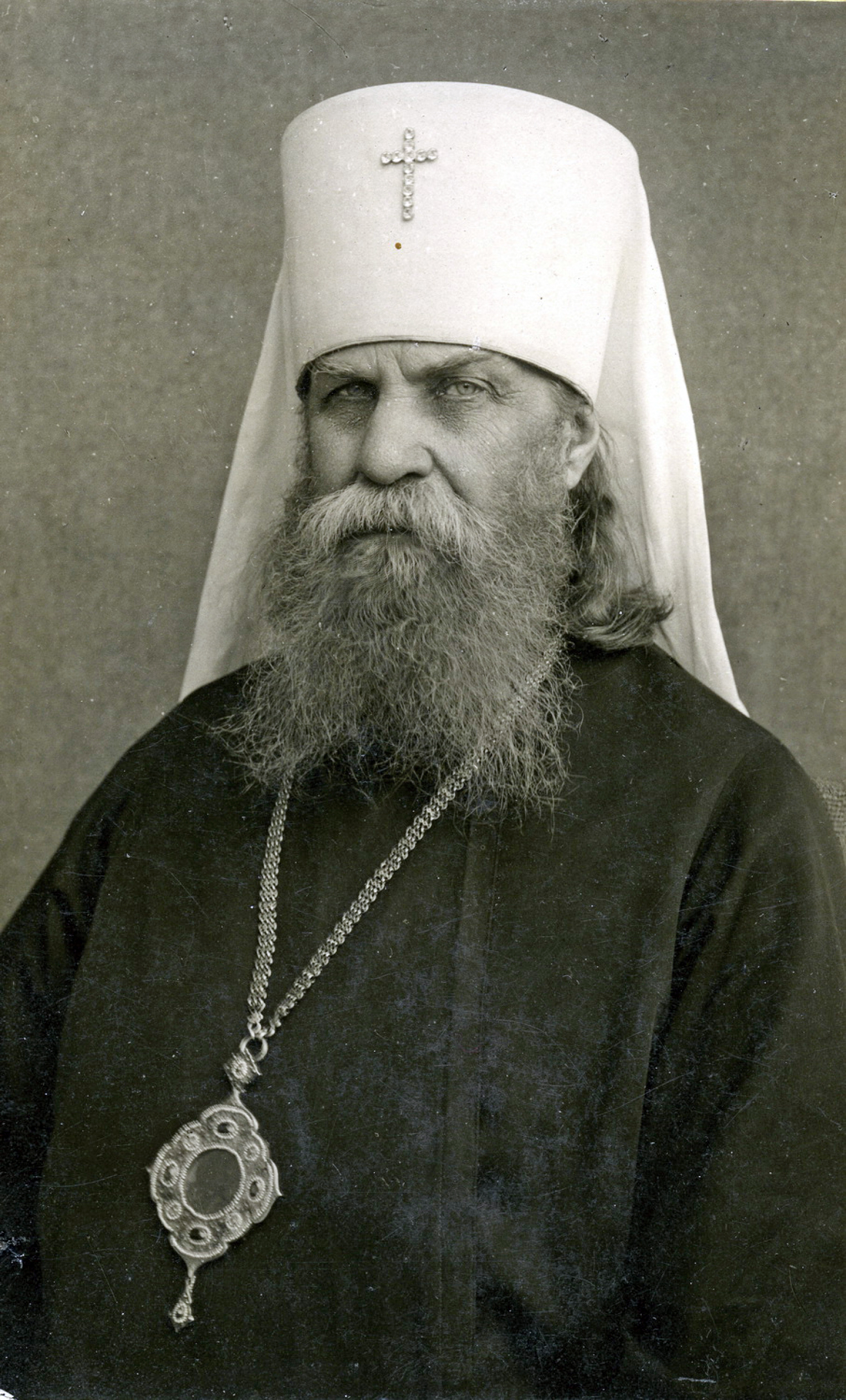
Peter of Krutitsky

- The Metropolitan Peter of Krutitsy of the Russian Orthodox Church since the April 7 death of the Patriarch Tikhon, was arrested on charges of conspiring with Russian citizens who had emigrated from the Soviet Union. Peter would remain in internal exile or in prison for the rest of his life, and ultimately executed in 1937.
- The U.S. Governor-General of the Philippines, U.S. Army General Leonard Wood, announced that he had vetoed a bill passed by the territorial legislature that would have provided for a plebiscite on the issue of independence.
- The Swinton Lions defeated the Wigan Warriors 15–11 to win rugby's Lancashire Cup.
- Born: Atif Yilmaz; Turkish filmmaker; in Mersin, Turkey (d. 2006)
- Died: Pablo Iglesias, 75, Spanish socialist and co-founder of the Spanish Socialist Workers Party (b. 1850)

== December 10, 1925 (Thursday) ==
- The Nobel Prizes for 1925 were awarded in Oslo. The honourees consisted of James Franck and Gustav Hertz (award for Physics), Richard Adolf Zsigmondy (Chemistry) and George Bernard Shaw (Literature). There was no Prize for Medicine that year. The Peace Prize was not awarded at the time either; Austen Chamberlain of the United Kingdom and Charles G. Dawes of the United States were named retroactively twelve months later for their roles in the Locarno Treaties and the Dawes Plan, respectively.
- Lúcia de Jesus Rosa dos Santos, who had been one of the three girls in Portugal who reported the first visions of Our Lady of Fátima on May 13, 1917, reported that she had experienced another vision of the Virgin Mary and the Christ Child, this time in Pontevedra in Spain, where she was a nun at the convent of the Institute of the Sisters of St. Dorothy.
- The Chicago Cardinals football team beat the Milwaukee Badgers 59–0 in a game that resulted in the Chicago Cardinals–Milwaukee Badgers scandal, because the Badgers team was composed of high school players that the Cardinals could easily beat in order to pad their win–loss percentage and claim the NFL championship.

== December 11, 1925 (Friday) ==
- Pope Pius XI promulgated Quas primas, an encyclical introducing the Feast of Christ the King.
- Bernardino Machado took office as the new President of Portugal immediately after being elected in a joint session by 175 of the 198 members of the Congresso da República. With approval by three-fourths of the voting members present, Machado received 124 votes, eight short of the 132 required, Duarte Leite had 33, and 18 others were divided among several candidates. On the next round, with 159 members voting, Machado received 148, after which President Manuel Teixeira Gomes stepped down.
- Karam Chand and Kartari Chand, whose marriage would continue for more than 90 years and stand as the second-longest recorded marriage in history, were wed in a Sikh ceremony in India. The relationship would last for 90 years, 9 months and 19 days, ending on September 30, 2016, with the death of Karam Chand.
- In the U.S., New York's Governor Al Smith pardoned Communist politician Benjamin Gitlow, who had been convicted of sedition for publishing a leftist manifesto that advocated overthrow of the U.S. government. Gitlow, whose conviction was upheld in a landmark case by the U.S. Supreme Court in June, had been incarcerated at the Sing Sing prison in Ossining, New York, since November 9. Smith declared in his pardon that Gitlow had been "sufficiently punished for a political crime" and that "no additional punishment would act as a deterrent to those who would preach an erroneous doctrine of Government."
- Born: Paul Greengard, American neuroscientist and 2000 co-recipient of the 2000 Nobel Prize in Physiology or Medicine for "discoveries concerning signal transduction in the nervous system"; in New York City, United States (d. 2019)

== December 12, 1925 (Saturday) ==
- Iran's Parliament, the Majles-e Showrā-ye Mellī, voted to declare Prime Minister, General Reza Khan Pahlavi, as the new monarch, installing him as the Shah of Iran and bringing an end to the Qajar dynasty that had ruled since 1789.
- The Pottsville Maroons football team played an exhibition game against the Notre Dame Fighting Irish in Philadelphia, winning 9 to 7. The unauthorized game caused the 1925 NFL Championship controversy when National Football League President Joseph Carr immediately suspended the Maroons and denied them the rights to the championship on the grounds that they had violated the territorial rights of the Frankford Yellow Jackets.

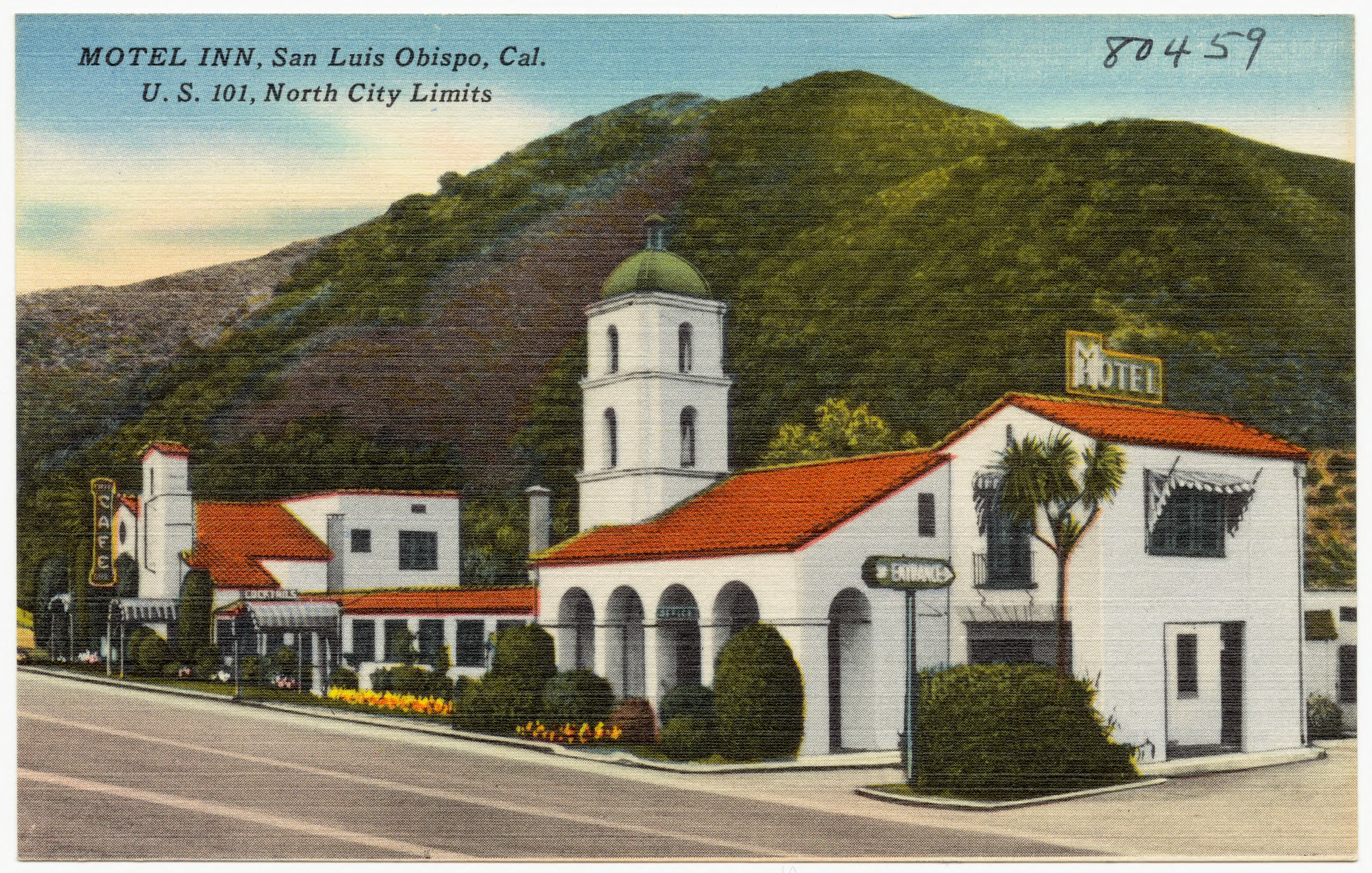
The first Motel

- The first motel (a portmanteau of "motor" and "hotel") in the world, the Milestone Mo-Tel, was opened in San Luis Obispo, California. The business would later be renamed the Motel Inn.
- The Chilean National Zoo opened in Santiago.
- Born:
  - Ted Kennedy, Canadian professional ice hockey player for the NHL Toronto Maple Leafs, 1955 Hart Memorial Trophy winner for Most Valuable Player, and was inducted into the Hockey Hall of Fame in 1966; as Theodore Kennedy, in Humberstone, Ontario, Canada (d. 2009)
  - Ahmad Shamlou, Iranian poet, writer and journalist; in Rasht, Imperial Iran (present-day Iran) (d. 2000)
  - Vladimir Shainsky, Soviet Ukrainian composer; in Kiev, Ukrainian SSR, Soviet Union (present-day Ukraine) (d. 2017)
  - Dodo Marmarosa, American jazz pianist and composer; as Michael Marmarosa, in Pittsburgh, United States (d. 2002)

== December 13, 1925 (Sunday) ==
- Seymour Gilbert, the U.S. Agent General for Reparations to Germany, released his first annual report in Berlin, announcing that Germany was making rapid advances in its industrial and economic health and was fulfilling all its Dawes Plan commitments to the last detail.
- Born:
  - Dick Van Dyke, American actor, singer and dancer, winner of six Emmy Awards, a Grammy Award and a Tony Award; as Richard Van Dyke, in West Plains, Missouri, United States (alive in 2026)
  - Babatunde Jose, Nigerian journalist and newspaper editor; as Ismail Babatunde Jose, in Lagos, British Nigeria (present-day Nigeria) (d. 2008)
  - Ozell Sutton, African American military officer who was one of the first Black members of the U.S. Marine Corps, recipient of the Congressional Gold Medal; in Gould, Arkansas, United States (d. 2015)
  - Pal Mirashi, Albanian footballer with 9 caps for the Albania national team; in Shkodër, Albanian Republic (present-day Albania) (d. 2001)
- Died: Antonio Maura, 72, Spanish politician, served as the Prime Minister of Spain five-times between 1903 and 1922 (b. 1853)

== December 14, 1925 (Monday) ==
- Pope Pius XI elevated four new cardinals: Bonaventura Cerretti, Enrico Gasparri, Irishman Patrick O'Donnell and Alessandro Verde. He also made a speech that did not specifically mention Mussolini or fascism by name but condemned "legislation which makes the state and not the church the center of social life."
- The League of Nations settled the border between Greece and Bulgaria and fined the Greek government for the border violation committed during the Incident at Petrich.
- Italy's Fascist government signed a secret pact with Britain aimed at reinforcing Italian dominance in Ethiopia.
- The Alban Berg opera Wozzeck, based on the incomplete Georg Büchner play Woyzeck, was premiered by the Berlin State Opera.
- Born:
  - Helen O'Brien, Romanian-born British spy for MI5 and MI6; as Elena Constantinescu, in Bucharest, Kingdom of Romania (present-day Romania) (d. 2005)
  - Sam Jones, American professional baseball pitcher, 1959 National League (NL) winner for most wins and lowest ERA, and NL winner for most strikeouts in 1955, 1956 and 1958; as Samuel Jones, in Stewartsville, Ohio, United States (d. 1971)
  - Selma Walker, Dakota Sioux social worker and rights activist; as Thelma Louis Sully, on the Yankton Indian Reservation in Greenwood, South Dakota, United States (d. 1997)
  - Akira Nishiguchi, Japanese serial killer; in Osaka, Empire of Japan (present-day Japan) (d. 1970, executed)

== December 15, 1925 (Tuesday) ==
- The War Ministry of Japan ordered 3,500 troops to Manchuria to protect the South Manchuria Railway and other Japanese interests around Mukden as the forces of Guo Songling advanced against Zhang Zuolin.
- A League of Nations commission ruled on the Mosul Question by assigning most of the territory in the oil-rich Mosul region to Iraq, despite strong Turkish objections.

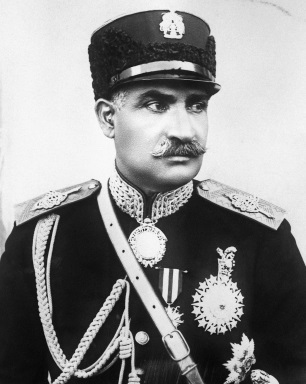
Reza Shah Pahlavi

- Reza Shah took the oath to become the first shah of Persia of the Pahlavi dynasty.

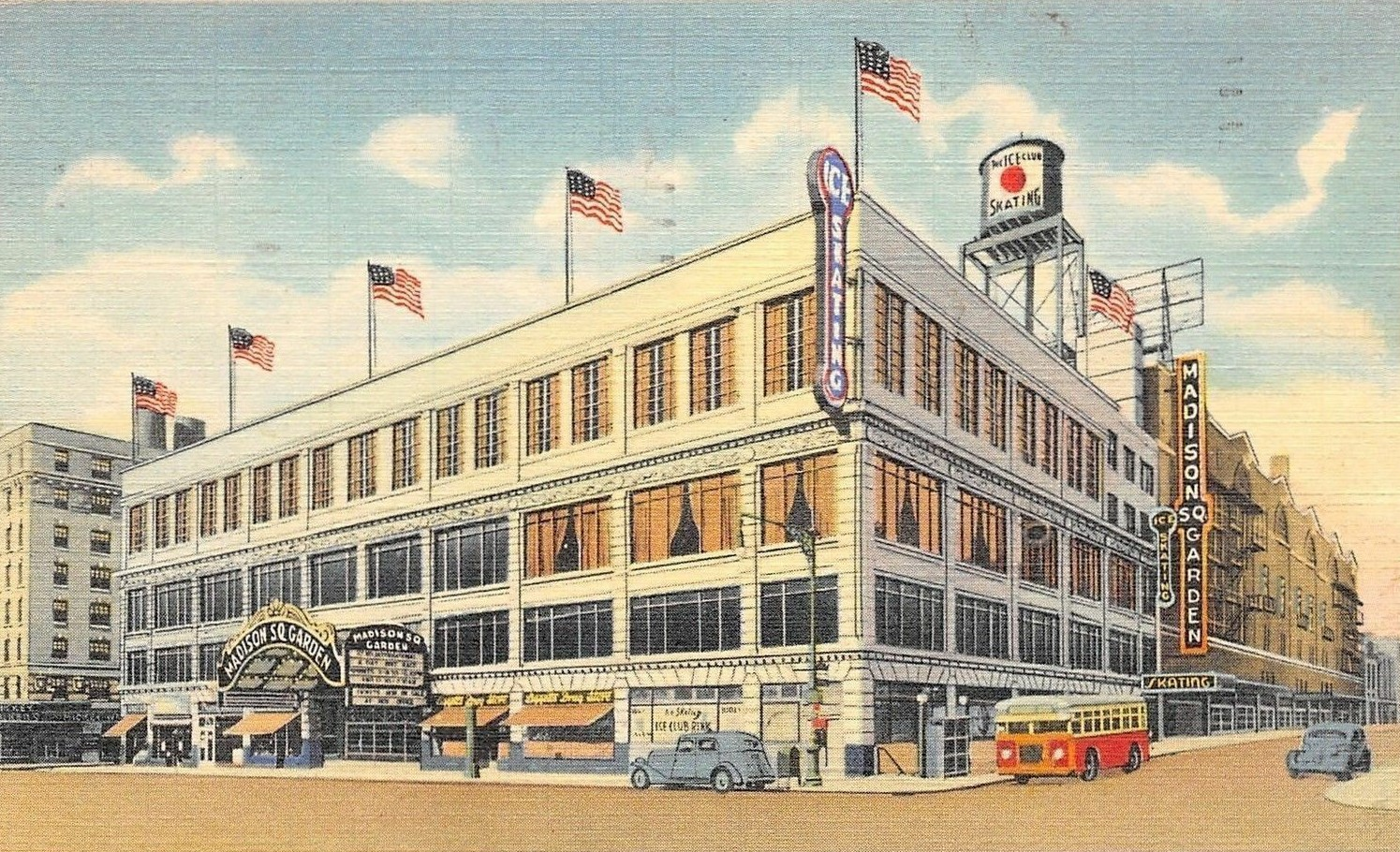
Madison Square Garden c. 1941

- The third version of Madison Square Garden opened in New York City. The first official event was the New York Americans hockey team playing their first ever home game, losing 3–1 to the Montreal Canadiens. The new Prince of Wales Trophy, which would eventually be awarded to the playoff winner of the National Hockey League), was presented to the Canadiens as winner of the opener at the Garden, and later to the Montreal Maroons as winners of the 1925-26 NHL playoffs, before being awarded for a variety of accomplishments in the century that followed.
- The new headquarters of the State Bank of Morocco was inaugurated in Rabat.
- The silent film The Plastic Age, Clara Bow's first successful movie, opened with Donald Keith as her co-star.

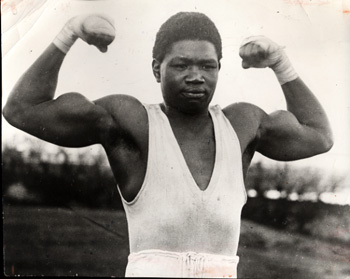
Battling Siki

- Born: Leonard Isaacson, American composer and computer scientist who collaborated with Lejaren Hiller to program the ILLIAC I create Illiac Suite in 1957, which was the first piece of music to be composed by a computer; in Chicago, United States (d. 2018)
- Died:
  - Battling Siki, 28, Senegalese-born American boxer who held the light-heavyweight title for six months in 1922 and 1923; was shot to death in New York City (b. 1897)
  - Labotsibeni Mdluli, 65–66, Queen Mother and Queen Regent of Swaziland (now Eswatini) (b. c. 1859)

== December 16, 1925 (Wednesday) ==
- Radio broadcasting was introduced to Sri Lanka and to Asia as Colombo Radio (now Radio Ceylon) began from the suburb of Welikada and transmitting with a 1,000 watt station.
- The Council of the League of Nations voted to award the Mosul vilayet, formerly territory of the Ottoman Empire prior to World War One, to the British Mandate for Iraq. The Mosul territory, inhabited primarily by the Kurdish people, included what are now Mosul (including the city of the same name); Sharizor and its capital, Kirkuk; Sulaymaniyah; and Halabja.
- The Italianization of South Tyrol became a contentious subject between Italy and Germany as a newspaper run by Gustav Stresemann ran an editorial protesting an Italian decree banning Christmas trees. "Have the most influential of the Italian politicians been abandoned by their God or their common sense, or have they without exception gone mad with their Fascist megalomania. For this newest deed can only be described as that of a crazy person", the editorial declared.
- Alpha Phi Omega, a national service fraternity, was founded at Lafayette College in Pennsylvania.
- The werewolf film Wolf Blood, described as "one of the first werewolf films in the history of cinema", was released in the United States; according to a plot description, logging camp boss Dick Bannister receives a transfusion of blood from a wolf after he is severely beaten by loggers from a rival camp and later dreams that he is slaughtering the rival loggers while leading a pack of wolves, after which the loggers are found to have been killed by wild animals. Having heard about Bannister's violent dreams, the loggers then organize a lynch mob to kill him.
- Born: Kapitolina Rumiantseva, Soviet Russian painter and graphic artist; in Leningrad, Soviet Union (present-day Saint Petersburg, Russia) (d. 2002)

== December 17, 1925 (Thursday) ==
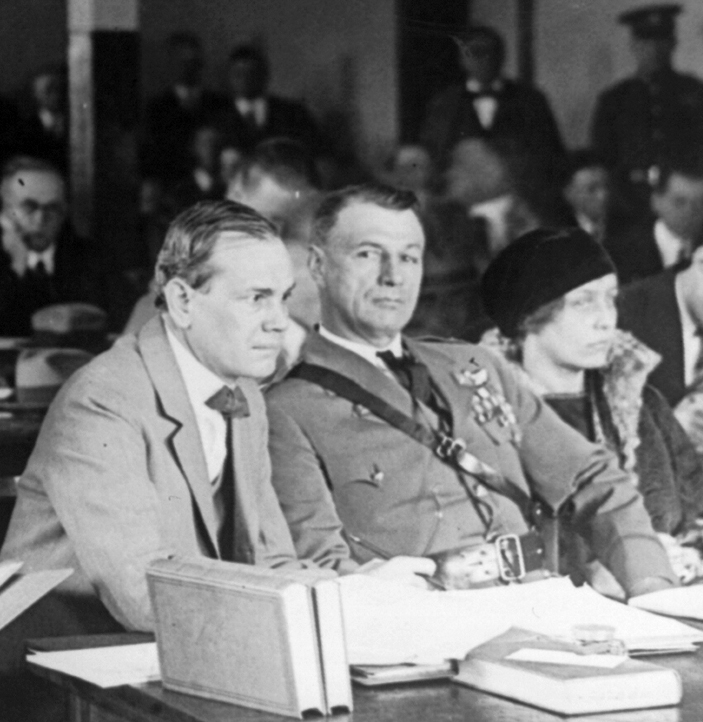
U.S. Army Colonel William L. Mitchell, convicted of insubordination

- U.S. Army Colonel Billy Mitchell was convicted on all eight charges of insubordination at his court-martial. Mitchell was suspended without pay for five years, a verdict the court ruled was "lenient because of the military record of the accused during the world war."
- The day after the former Turkish territory of Mosul was awarded to Iraq, Turkey signed a security pact with the Soviet Union.
- Natacha Rambova filed for divorce from Rudolph Valentino in Paris court.
- Died: A. N. "Monkey" Hornby, 78, English cricketer and captain of the England cricket team, as well as a star footballer and rugby union player (b. 1847)

== December 18, 1925 (Friday) ==
- The 14th Congress of the Soviet Communist Party opened at the Andreeskvii Hall in Kremlin in Moscow for the start of a 13-day session, with 1,306 delegates (665 of whom were voting members). Alexei Rykov, chairman of the Council of People's Commissars of the Soviet Union (Sovnarkom), opened the session, and the Communist Party's General Secretary, Joseph Stalin, delivered the Political Report of the Central Committee, setting the agenda for the Congress reforms.
- António Maria da Silva became Prime Minister of Portugal for the fourth time.
- Born:
  - Edward D. "Ted" Jones, American investment strategist and son of Edward D. Jones, who built his father's company, Edward Jones Investments, into a large U.S. brokerage; in St. Louis, United States (d. 1990)
  - Francine Parker, American film director; as Francine Schoenholtz, in New York City, United States (d. 2007)
- Died: Hamo Thornycroft, 75, British sculptor (b. 1850)

== December 19, 1925 (Saturday) ==
- The siege of Jeddah, capital of the Kingdom of Hejaz, ended after 10 months as the city's defenders surrendered to the city to the Sultanate of Nejd, led by the Sultan Ibn Saud and agreeing to work out terms for the occupation of the kingdom by Nejd's forces. King Ali of Hejaz abdicated the throne and was allowed to safely depart.
- Reichstag President Paul Löbe spoke out in favour of partial prohibition in Germany.
- Born:
  - Rabah Bitat, Algerian politician and nationalist, served as interim President of Algeria from 1978 to 1979; in Aïn Kerma, French Algeria (present-day Algeria) (d. 2000)
  - Robert B. Sherman, American songwriter known his collaboration with his brother Richard in the Sherman Brothers, writer of "It's a Small World" and numerous film scores; in New York City, United States (d. 2012)
  - Lepa Radić, Yugoslav Partisan and resistance fighter during World War II; in Gašnica, Kingdom of Serbs, Croats and Slovenes (present-day Republika Srpska, Bosnia and Herzegovina) (d. 1943, executed)
- Died:
  - José Ignacio Quintón, 44, Puerto Rican pianist and composer (b. 1881)
  - J. P. Snyman, 87, South African Republic general during the Second Boer War and commander of the Siege of Mafeking (b. 1838)

== December 20, 1925 (Sunday) ==
- The all-Black Renaissance Big Five defeated the all-white Original Celtics, 37 to 30, in a professional basketball game between two of the best teams in the U.S., both of whom claimed that they were world champions in their respective races.
- The United Artists Western film Tumbleweeds, starring William S. Hart and directed by King Baggot, premiered in New York City before being released across the U.S. on December 27.
- Born:
  - María Rosa Gallo, Argentine actress; in Buenos Aires, Argentina (d. 2004)
  - Oriol Bohigas, Spanish urban planner known for his modernization of Barcelona; in Barcelona, Spain (d. 2021)
- Died:
  - Federico Santa María, 80, Chilean investor and philanthropist, founder of the Federico Santa María Technical University (b. 1845)
  - Eugen Fraenkel, 72, Polish-born Jewish German bacteriologist known for discovering the gas gangrene bacillus (b. 1853)
  - Hanina Karchevsky, 47–48, Polish Jewish composer who emigrated to Palestine in 1908; hanged himself (b. 1877)

== December 21, 1925 (Monday) ==
- The Sergei Eisenstein film Battleship Potemkin was first shown in the Soviet Union, with a special invitation-only screening at the Bolshoi Theatre in conjunction with a ceremony to honor the Russian Revolution of 1905. The film was released to the general public soon after, premiering in Moscow on January 18, 1926.
- A Soviet decree announced that December 25 and 26 would be "days of rest" throughout Russia, although no mention of Christmas was made. Soviet efforts to make its citizens go to work on Christmas had been unpopular in previous years.
- Born:
  - Dorothy Kamenshek, American professional baseball player in the All-American Girls Professional Baseball League, league batting champion in 1946 and 1947, and the league's all time leader in hits and total bases; in Norwood, Ohio, United States (d. 2010)
  - Intizar Hussain, Pakistani novelist; in Dibai, United Provinces of Agra and Oudh, British India (present-day Uttar Pradesh, India) (d. 2016)
- Died:
  - Jules Méline, 87, French statesman, served as the Prime Minister of France from 1896 to 1898 (b. 1838)
  - Lottie Lyell, 35, Australian actress, screenwriter, editor, and filmmaker; died of tuberculosis (b. 1890)

== December 22, 1925 (Tuesday) ==
- The fantasy film A Kiss for Cinderella, now preserved at several archives, including the Museum of Modern Art in New York, was released. A production of Paramount Pictures, the 10-reel silent film of nearly two hours was not an adaptation of the fairy tale, depicting instead a modern-day romance between Jane, a domestic servant, and a policeman who proves to be her "prince charming."
- Born: Russ Mayberry, American television director; as Russell Mayberry, in Duluth, Minnesota, United States (d. 2012)

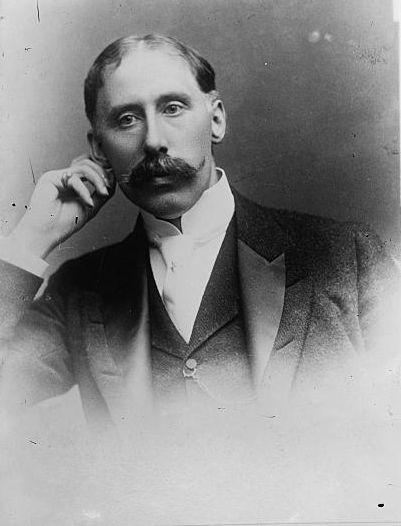
Frank Munsey

- Died:
  - Frank Munsey, 71, American magazine publisher known for creating the "pulp magazine" by using high-speed printing to mass produce low-priced periodicals, starting in 1882 with The Argosy; died from a burst appendix (b. 1854)
  - Mary Thurman, 30, American film actress; died of pneumonia (b. 1895)
  - Alice Heine, 68, American-born Princess of Monaco by marriage to Prince Albert of Monaco (b. 1857)
  - Henry K. Pomroy, 71, American financier who served as President of the New York Stock Exchange from 1903 to 1907 (b. 1854)

== December 23, 1925 (Wednesday) ==
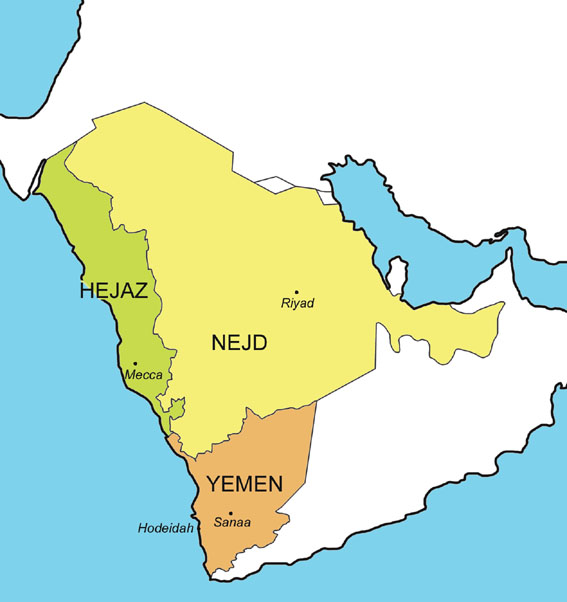
Hejaz conquered by Nejd to create Saudi Arabia

- With the abdication of the King of Hejaz and the agreement by the Sultanate of Nejd to surrender control of the Kingdom, Nejd troops entered the capital, Jeddah, and completed the Saudi conquest of Hejaz.
- Emiliano Figueroa was inaugurated as the 18th President of Chile after having won the October 22 election. Figueroa, who had briefly acted as president for three months in 1910 after the death of Pedro Montt, would serve until his resignation in 1927.
- Henri de Jouvenel was appointed to govern the French Mandate for Syria and Lebanon as High Commissioner of the Levant, administering the League of Nations mandated territory for six months until June 23, 1926.
- Born:
  - Mohammed Mzali, Tunisian politician, served as the Prime Minister of Tunisia from 1980 to 1986; in Monastir, French protectorate of Tunisia (present-day Tunisia) (d. 2010)
  - Henry C. Gordon, American aeronautical engineer, U.S. Air Force officer and test pilot who had been certified as an astronaut for the X-20 Dyna-Soar program prior to its cancellation in 1963; in Valparaiso, Indiana, United States (d. 1996)
  - Harry Guardino, American actor; as Harold Guardino, in New York City, United States (d. 1995)
  - Duncan Hallas, British communist activist; in Manchester, England (d. 2002)
- Died: George Edwin Taylor, 68, American journalist, political activist, and politician, known as the first African American presidential candidate who ran in the 1904 U.S. presidential election as the nominee for the National Negro Liberty Party (b. 1857)

== December 24, 1925 (Thursday) ==
- Italy's parliament, dominated by the Fascist Party, passed Law No. 2263, "Decree on powers of the head of government", declaring that the decisions of Prime Minister Benito Mussolini and his government were not subject to legislative review, and that Mussolini— whose title was changed from "Presidente del Consiglio dei Ministri" ("President of the Council of Ministers") to "Capo del Governo" ("Head of the Government")— could only be overruled by order of the King, Victor Emmanuel III.
- Winnie-the-Pooh, the popular children's media character created by A. A. Milne, was first identified by name as part of a Christmas story published by London newspaper The Evening News. Previously, Milne had referred to the character as "Edward" in the poem "Teddy Bear" in Punch magazine in 1924.
- Pope Pius XI closed the holy door at St. Peter's Basilica as the Jubilee year drew to a close.

== December 25, 1925 (Friday) ==
- Nomura Securities, one of the world's largest independent investment banks and oldest brokerage firm in Japan, was founded in Japan, a separate section from Osaka Nomura Bank.
- The American Geographic Society announced the recipients of medals for notable contributions to the field of geography. Lucien Gallois, Erich von Drygalski, Robert Bartlett and David L. Brainard were among the honorees.
- Born:
  - Carlos Castaneda, Peruvian-born American author known for his trilogy The Teachings of Don Juan, A Separate Reality and Journey to Ixtlan; as Carlos César Salvador Arana, in Cajamarca, Peru (d. 1998)
  - Dorothy Mueller, American professional baseball pitcher in the AAGPBL, with 92 wins in games six seasons and 1.80 ERA; in Cheviot, Ohio, United States (d. 1985)
  - Jürgen Roland, German television and film producer known for multiple detective and police shows, including Stahlnetz and Großstadtrevier; as Jürgen Schellack, in Hamburg, Germany (d. 2007)
- Died:
  - Karl Abraham, 48, German psychoanalyst and collaborator of Sigmund Freud; died from a lung infection (b. 1877)
  - Guo Songling, 41–42, Chinese general who served in the Fengtian Army; executed after leading a revolt against Zhang Zuolin and attacking Zhang's capital at Shenyang (b. 1883)
  - Hasan al-Kharrat, 63–64, Syrian guerrilla leader and rebel commander in the Great Syrian Revolt; was ambushed and shot to death by French troops (b. 1861)

== December 26, 1925 (Saturday) ==
- The Communist Party of India was formally organized by Satya Bhakta at a conference of 500 people in Cawnpore in the United Provinces of Agra and Oudh in British India.
- Italy effectively brought an end to the rebellion in its colony of Italian Somaliland (now part of Somalia), recapturing El Buur, driving out the rebel commander Omar Sanatar and the Sultan Ali Yusuf Kenadid, and shutting down the 37-year-old Sultanate of Hobyo.
- Turkey passed its Law No. 698, requiring that, effective January 1, the Gregorian calendar would be used for all government affairs, and banning use of the Islamic calendar and its hybrid, the Rumi calendar, in all government affairs.
- Richard "Pegleg" Lonergan, leader of New York City's White Hand Gang, was killed along with two henchmen, Aaron Hyams and Neal J. Perry, after arriving intoxicated at the Adonis Social Club, a speakeasy at 152 Twentieth Street in Brooklyn, at three in the morning. While he was uttering various racial slurs, the lights went out, and shots were fired. Al Capone had been in the club while on a visit to New York and had carried out the hit at the request of Frankie Yale. The ambush further enhanced Capone's notoriety.
- The first college all-star football game in the U.S., the East–West Shrine Game, was played before 25,000 fans at Ewing Field in San Francisco, with the West team defeating the East, 6 to 0. The game was sponsored by Shriners Hospitals for Children, with profits of $30,000 going to the organization.
- Died:
  - Jules Patenôtre des Noyers, 80, French diplomat who served at various times as the French ambassador to Sweden, China, Morocco, the United States, and Spain (b. 1845)
  - Robert Henry Hendershot, 74–78, drummer boy in the American Civil War; died of pneumonia (b. c. 1847–1851)

== December 27, 1925 (Sunday) ==
- Basil III became the Coptic Christian Archbishop of Jerusalem, Palestine and the Near East.
- A mine explosion killed 52 coal miners near Palaú, in the Mexican state of Coahuila.
- Born:
  - Manuel Ayau, Guatemala educator, founder of Universidad Francisco Marroquín; in Guatemala City, Guatemala (d. 2010)
  - Roostijati, Indonesian singer and actress; in Bandung, West Java, Dutch East Indies (present-day Indonesia) (d. 1975)
- Died: Marie-Louise Jaÿ, 87, French businesswoman, founder of the La Samaritaine department store chain (b. 1838)

== December 28, 1925 (Monday) ==
- The Japan Sumo Association (Nihon Sumō Kyōkai) was founded as the Tokyo-based sumo wrestling organization expanded to include all of Japan.
- Crown Prince Carol of Romania, son of King Ferdinand, renounced his right to the throne of Romania following an extramarital affair with Magda Lupescu. His renunciation left his son Michael, as the heir apparent. After Michael became king in 1927, Carol returned to Romania and dethroned his son to become King Carol II.
- A National Hockey League game between two now defunct NHL teams set a record that still stands almost 100 years later, with 141 shots on goal in the 60-minute period. The New York Americans made 73 attempts to score, and were denied 70 times by the Pirates' Ray Worters, while the Pittsburgh Pirates made 68 shots, with the Americans' Jake Forbes stopping all but one in New York's 3 to 1 win.
- The George Gershwin musical Tip-Toes opened on Broadway at the Liberty Theatre for the first of 192 performances, with Queenie Smith in the title role, Allen Kearns, and Jeanette MacDonald.
- Born:
  - Milton Obote, Ugandan politician, served as the President of Uganda from 1966 to 1971 and from 1980 to 1985; as Apollo Milton Obote, in Akokoro, Protectorate of Uganda (present-day Uganda) (d. 2005)
  - Povl Riis, Danish gastroenterologist who became the first person to use amniocentesis to diagnose a genetic disease in an unborn child (d. 2017)
  - Hildegard Knef, German actress, singer and writer; in Ulm, Germany (d. 2002)
- Died:
  - Raymond P. Rodgers, 76, U.S. Navy Rear Admiral, Director of the Office of Naval Intelligence and President of the Naval War College (b. 1849)
  - Sergei Yesenin, 30, Russian poet; hanged himself in his room at the Hotel Angleterre (b. 1895)
  - Louisa Aldrich-Blake, 60, pioneering British surgeon who was the first woman to be certified as a Master of Surgery; died from cancer (b. 1865)
  - Román Mayorga Rivas, 62–63, Nicaraguan journalist (b. 1862)

== December 29, 1925 (Tuesday) ==
- Europe began to get hit with a series of major floods. Hungary and Romania were the first to be struck hard, where Cluj-Napoca and Debrecen were inundated and about 100 people drowned.
- Born:
  - Luis Alberto Monge, Costa Rican trade unionist and politician, served as the President of Costa Rica from 1982 to 1986; in Palmares, Alajuela Province, Costa Rica (d. 2016)
  - Pete Dye, American golf course designer; as Paul Dye Jr., in Urbana, Ohio, United States (d. 2020)
  - Keshav Dutt, Indian field hockey player with 22 appearances for the India national team; in Lahore, Punjab Province, British India (present-day Pakistan) (d. 2021)
- Died: Félix Vallotton, 60, Swiss painter and printmaker (b. 1865)

== December 30, 1925 (Wednesday) ==
- The historical epic film Ben-Hur was shown for the first time, premiering in the United States at the George M. Cohan Theater in New York City.
- In the U.S., the Association of College Honor Societies was formed by representatives of six organizations, Alpha Omega Alpha; the Order of the Coif; Phi Beta Kappa; Phi Kappa Phi; Sigma Xi; Tau Beta Pi.
- Born:
  - Leif Leifland, Swedish diplomat, served as the State Secretary for Foreign Affairs from 1977 to 1982 and as Sweden's ambassador to the United Kingdom from 1982 to 1991; in Stockholm, Sweden (d. 2015)
  - Michael Terrace, American ballroom and stage dancer; as Michael Santiago Gutierrez, in Spanish Harlem, New York City, United States (d. 2018)
  - Ian MacNaughton, Scottish actor; as Edward Ian MacNaughton, in Glasgow, Scotland (d. 2002)
- Died:
  - Jimmy Forrest, 61, English footballer and the first professional player on the England national football team (b. 1864)
  - Frank Hinkey, 55, American college football player, inducted into the College Football Hall of Fame in 1951; died of tuberculosis (b. 1870)

== December 31, 1925 (Thursday) ==
- The first attempt at a worldwide New Year's celebration was made via international radio. The United States sent out musical entertainment and New Year's greetings from the consuls general of various foreign countries in New York. Evening listeners for participating stations across the United States heard a radio announcer in London say, "This is 2LO calling America and sending New Year's greetings. We have received word that the American stations are broadcasting this program, and we hope that it is being relayed successfully."
- Italy's parliament approved Law No. 2307, giving head of government Benito Mussolini authority to close any opposition newspapers or magazines, a power he would use on October 31, 1926.
- Belgium was hit with its worst flooding since 1876.
- Khovar, the official news agency of the Republic of Tajikistan, was established in Dushanbe as the Tajik Telegraph Agency in the Soviet Union. After serving as the agency for the Tadzhik Soviet Socialist Republic during the Soviet era, Khovar continued following Tajikistan's independence in 1991.
- William T. Collins was sworn into office as the acting Mayor of New York City to fill out the remaining term of Mayor John Francis Hylan, who retired one day early. Collins served as mayor for only 24 hours, until the swearing in of Jimmy Walker on New Year's Day.
- The first Saint Silvester Road Race (Corrida Internacional de São Silvestre), held annually in São Paulo on Saint Sylvester's Day, was run for the first time and won by Alfredo Gomes. It is the oldest and most prestigious street race in Brazil.
- Died: J. Gordon Edwards, 58, Canadian filmmaker (b. 1867)
