= January 1926 =

Month of 1926

<<	January 1926					>>
Su	Mo	Tu	We	Th	Fr	Sa
					1	2
3	4	5	6	7	8	9
10	11	12	13	14	15	16
17	18	19	20	21	22	23
24	25	26	27	28	29	30
31

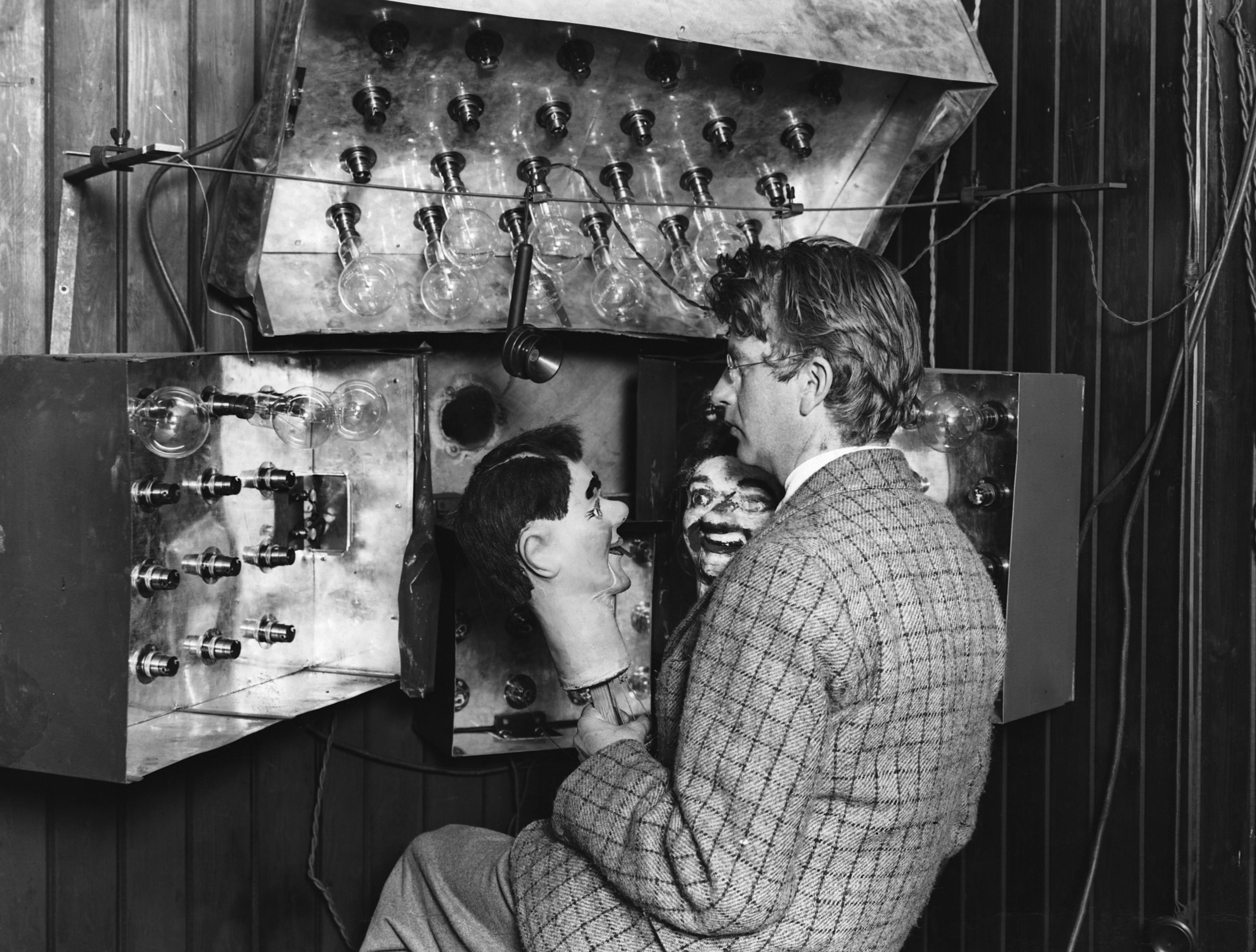
January 26, 1926: John Logie Baird demonstrates his television camera.

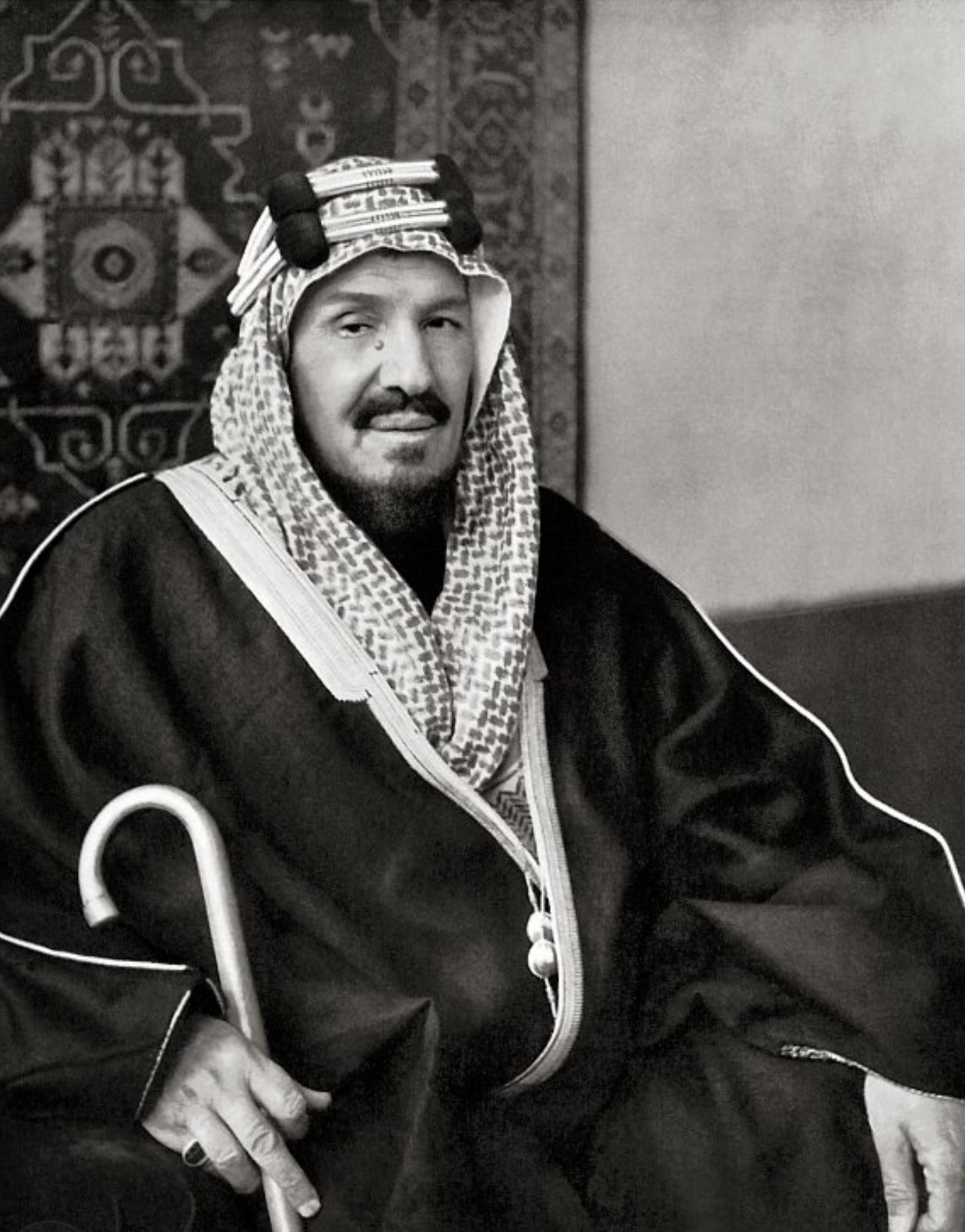
January 8, 1926: Ibn Saud becomes the King of Hejaz, later Saudi Arabia.

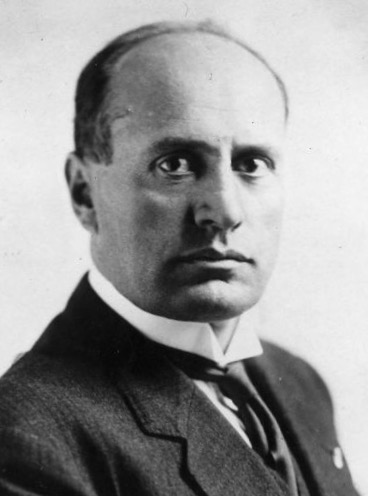
January 31, 1926: Prime Minister Benito Mussolini is given the power to rule Italy by decree.

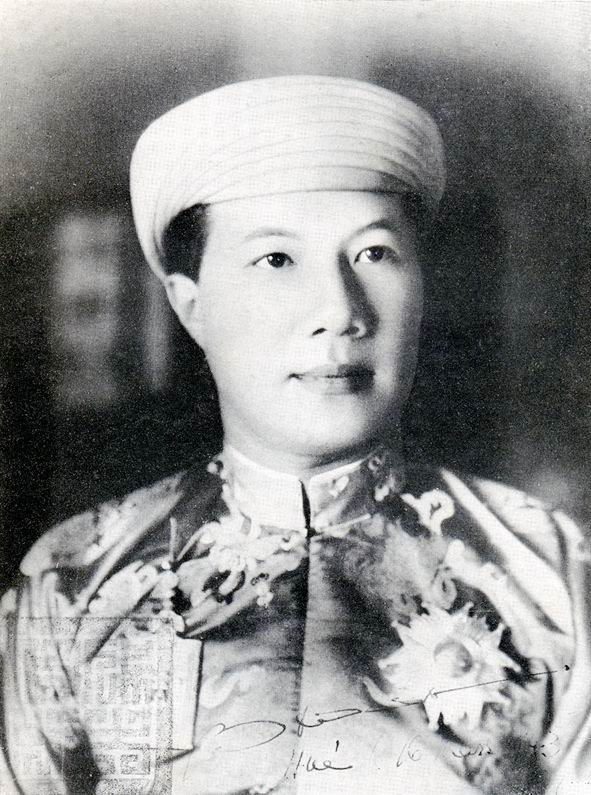
January 8, 1926: Bao Dai becomes Emperor of Vietnam.

The following events occurred in January 1926:

== January 1, 1926 (Friday) ==
- Flooding of the Rhine River struck the German city of Köln and 50,000 people were forced to evacuate their homes. The torrent of water rose 35 feet (11 m) for the worst flooding there in more than 100 years.
- Radio programming was introduced to Ireland as its first radio station, 2RN (later Radio Éireann), began regular broadcasting.
- The unbeaten and untied (9–0–0) Alabama Crimson Tide, champion of the Southern Conference played against unbeaten and the once-tied (10–0–1) Pacific Coast Conference champion Washington Huskies met in the Rose Bowl at Pasadena, California before 56,000 spectators. Despite trailing, 12–0 at halftime, Alabama scored three touchdowns in the 3rd quarter to take a 20–12 lead and won by a single point, 20 to 19. The victory has been referred to at Alabama as "the game that changed the South" because it showed to the American public that the impoverished Deep South states could compete with the western and eastern programs that had previously dominated college football.
- Earlier in the day, the collapse of wooden seats during the annual Tournament of Roses Parade severely injured 30 people and hurt more than 200 others.
- The U.S. city of Daytona Beach, Florida was created by the merger of the towns of Daytona, Daytona Beach, Kingston, and Seabreeze.
- Born:
  - V. K. Ramasamy, Indian comedian and film actor who appeared in more than 500 films over a 54-year career; as Virudhunagar Kanthan Ramasamy, in Virudhunagar, Presidency of Fort St. George, British India (present-day Tamil Nadu, India) (d. 2002)
  - James E. Johnson, U.S. Marine and posthumous Medal of Honor recipient for his heroism in the Battle of Chosin Reservoir during the Korean War; in Pocatello, Idaho, United States (d. 1950, killed in action)
  - Robert Descharnes, French photographer who served as business manager and press agent for the artist Salvador Dalí; in Nevers, Nièvre département, France (d. 2014)
  - D. Jamison Cain, United States Postal Service employee who coined the terms "Zone Improvement Plan" and "ZIP code" to describe the five-digit postal code launched in the U.S. on July 1, 1963; as David Jamison Cain Jr., in Sumter, South Carolina, United States (d. 2010)

== January 2, 1926 (Saturday) ==
- An explosion of pine gases in the U.S. city of Pensacola, Florida, killed 12 people and injured 17 others.
- The United States Lawn Tennis Association announced that Bill Tilden was ranked as the U.S. national champion for the sixth consecutive year, surpassing the record set by William A. Larned of five titles in a row from 1907 to 1911.
- Flooding continued to ravage Europe, from England to Romania, due to heavy rains and unseasonably high temperatures.
- Born:
  - Bruce Harlan, American Olympic diver, gold medalist in the 1948 Summer Olympics, and later the diving coach at the University of Michigan; in Marple Newtown, Pennsylvania, United States (d. 1959)
  - Moideen Kutty, Pakistani footballer and captain of the Pakistan national football team in 1954; in Melmuri, Presidency of St. George, British India (present-day Kerala, India) (d. 2005 or 2011)
  - Harold Bradley, American country music guitarist; in Nashville, Tennessee, United States (d. 2019)
  - Howard Caine, American character actor, best known for the recurring role of Major Hochstetter on Hogan's Heroes; as Howard Cohen, in North Hollywood, Los Angeles, United States (d. 1993)
- Died:
  - Richard Caton, 83, English physiologist noted for his 1875 discovery of the electrical nature of the brain and laying the groundwork for the 1929 discovery of the alpha wave rhythm in the human brain (b. 1842)
  - John Gray McKendrick, 84, Scottish physiologis and co-founder of the Physiological Society (b. 1841)

== January 3, 1926 (Sunday) ==
- General Theodoros Pangalos, who had become Prime Minister of Greece on June 24, 1925 in a coup d'état and restricted freedom of the press, declared a state of emergency and assumed dictatorial powers.
- Born:
  - George Martin, English record producer and composer, producer for The Beatles; in London, England (d. 2016)
  - W. Michael Blumenthal, German-American economist and politician, served as the 64th United States Secretary of the Treasury; as Werner Michael Blumenthal, in Oranienburg, Germany (alive in 2026)

== January 4, 1926 (Monday) ==
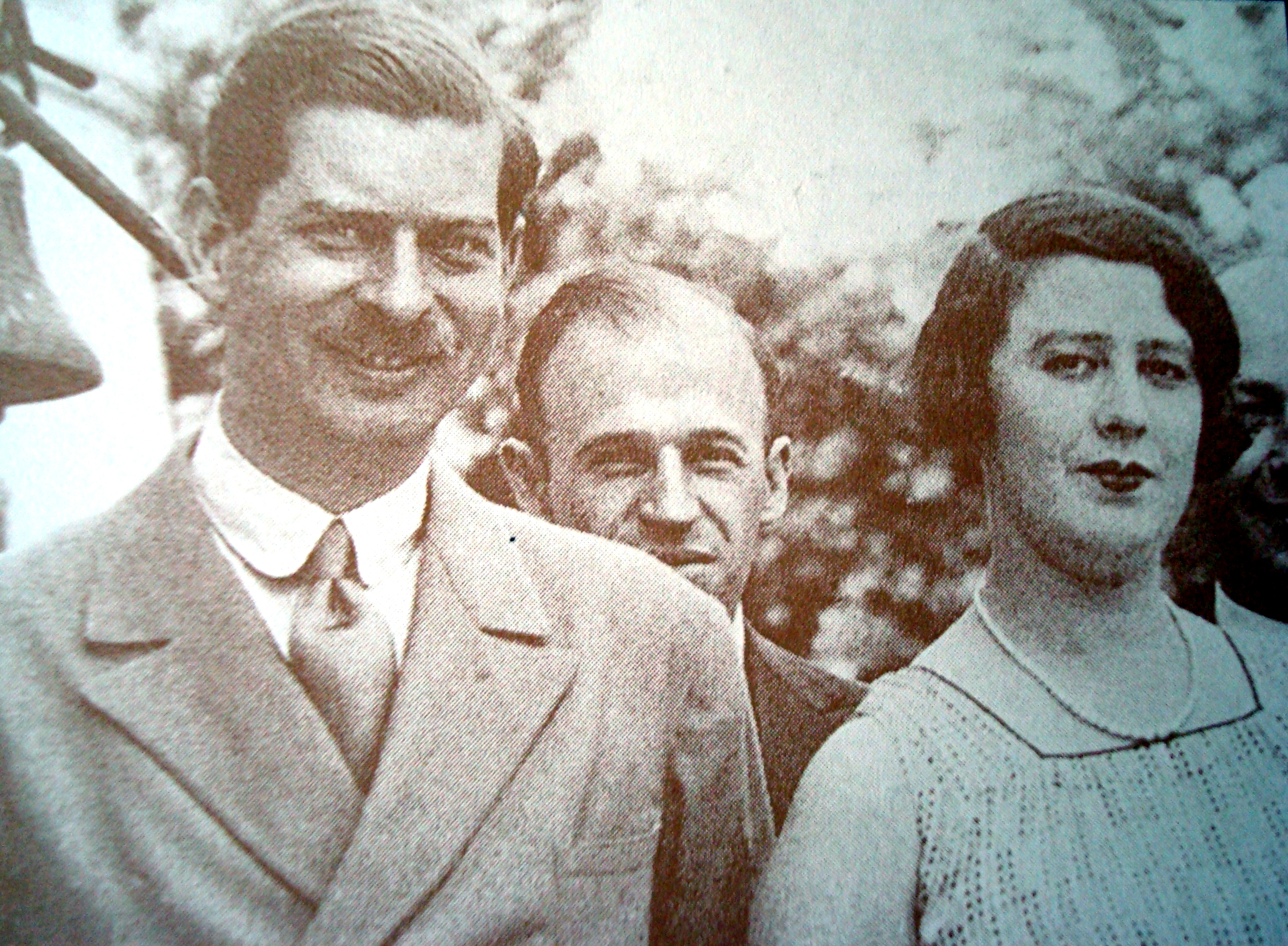
Prince Carol and Miss Lupescu

- The Parliament of Romania voted to accept Crown Prince Carol's renunciation of his right to the throne in the wake of his scandalous affair with Magda Lupescu, the Roman Catholic daughter of a Jewish pharmacist. Carol's four-year-old son Michael became the new Crown Prince. Carol would later renege on the renunciation and reigned as King of Romania from 1930 to 1940.
- Andrey Lyapchev took office as the new Prime Minister of Bulgaria, forming a government to succeed Aleksandar Tsankov. Lyapchev would serve until 1931.
- Died:
  - Margherita of Savoy, 74, Queen of Italy from 1878 to 1900 as wife of King Umberto I (b. 1851)
  - Mary Eliza Mahoney, 80, American nurse, was the first African American to study and work as a professionally-trained nurse (b. 1845)

== January 5, 1926 (Tuesday) ==
- In the United Kingdom, the first Widow's Pensions were paid out at post offices.
- Born:
  - Ghassan Tueni, Lebanese journalist and publisher of An Nahar; in Beirut, Greater Lebanon (present-day Lebanon) (d. 2012)
  - W.D. Snodgrass, American poet who wrote under his own name and the backward pseudonym "S. S. Gardons"; as William De Witt Snodgrass, in Beaver Falls, Pennsylvania, United States (d. 2009)
  - Nandanar, Indian novelist; as P. C. Gopalan, in Angadippuram, Madras presidency, British India (present-day Kerala, India) (d. 1974, committed suicide)
  - Candida Tobin, British music educator known for creating the Tobin Method; in Chingford, Essex, England (d. 2008)

== January 6, 1926 (Wednesday) ==
- The airline Deutsche Luft Hansa (DLH), whose name and staff were used by as part of the 1953 creation of the West German national airline Lufthansa was created in Berlin by the merger of the two largest airlines in Germany, Deutsche Luft-Reederei and Junkers Luftverkehr.
- Born: Mickey Hargitay, Hungarian-born American bodybuilder and 1955 Mr. Universe; as Miklós Károly Hargitay, in Budapest, Kingdom of Hungary (present-day, Hungary) (d. 2006)

== January 7, 1926 (Thursday) ==
- Ongoing downpours in Europe submerged Great War cemeteries in France and flooded the London subway system.
- The 15th Canadian Parliament was seated. William Lyon Mackenzie King continued as Prime Minister despite the Conservatives winning more seats in the last federal election, by forming a coalition with the Progressives. King had no seat in the House of Representatives after losing the election in the district of York North, Ontario.
- The Dartmouth Indians were announced as having been the number one team in U.S. college football for the 1925 season, as a University of Illinois economics professor released the first ratings under what was called the Dickinson System. Under his ratings, which used a measurement that considered overall records, number of games, margins of victory or loss, and strength of the opponent, Dartmouth College finished first with 20.00 points, while University of Michigan and University of Alabama were tied for second at 19.18 points. In order, the other teams in the Top 11 were Colgate University (18.75), University of Missouri (16.25), Tulane University (15.00), University of Washington (14.75), University of Wisconsin and Stanford University (13.75), University of Pittsburgh (12.50), and Lafayette College (11.88).

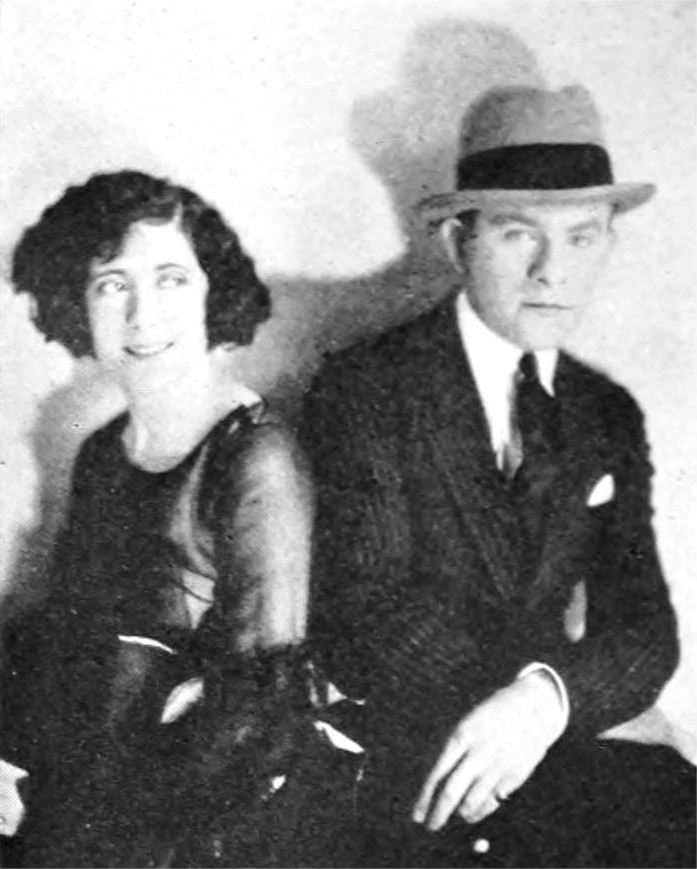
Gracie Allen and George Burns in 1924

- The comedy team of Burns and Allen was created as vaudevillians Gracie Allen and George Burns were married by a justice of the peace in Cleveland, Ohio.
- The Royal Academy of Italy was created by the Fascist Party with a declared purpose "to promote and coordinate Italian intellectual activity" and "to preserve the integrity of the national spirit, according to the genius and tradition of the race". The Royal Academy was dissolved after the fall of the Mussolini government in 1943.
- Born:
  - Lieutenant General Srinivas Kumar Sinha, Indian military officer and politician, served as the Vice Chief of Army Staff in 1983, as Governor of Assam from 1997 to 2003 and as Governor of Jammu and Kashmir from 2003 to 2008; in Patna, Bihar and Orissa Province, British India (present-day Bihar, India) (d. 2016)
  - Rosekrans Hoffman, American children's book author; as Ruth Olive Rosekrans, in Denton, Nebraska, United States (d. 2007)

== January 8, 1926 (Friday) ==
- At the Imperial City of Huế, the 12-year-old Prince Nguyễn Phúc Vĩnh Thụy was crowned as Emperor of Vietnam, taking the regnal name Bảo Đại. His father, the Emperor Khải Định, had died two months earlier on November 6.
- At the Grand Mosque of Mecca, Abdul-Aziz ibn Saud, Sultan of Nejd, was proclaimed King of Hejaz by the Public Assembly in a ceremony that included his taking of the oath of allegiance (the bayaa), completing the conquest that would lead to the creation of the Kingdom of Saudi Arabia in 1932.
- Three brothers, Herman, Henry and Hillel Hassenfeld incorporated the Hassenfeld Brothers company, initially to manufacture school supplies. The company would eventually begin making toys, under the name Hasbro.
- Born:
  - Chester Feldman, American game show producer; in The Bronx, New York City, United States (d. 1997)
  - Evelyn Lear, American operatic soprano; as Evelyn Shulman, in Brooklyn, New York City, United States (d. 2012)
  - Hanae Mori, Japanese fashion designer; in Yoshika, Shimane, Empire of Japan (present-day Japan) (d. 2022)
  - Kerwin Mathews, American actor known for starring as the title character in The 7th Voyage of Sinbad (1958), The Three Worlds of Gulliver (1960), and Jack the Giant Killer (1962); as Verne Kerwin Mathews, in Seattle, United States (d. 2007)
  - Soupy Sales; American comedian; as Milton Supman, in Franklinton, North Carolina, United States (d. 2009)
- Died: Andy Smith, 42, American college football player and coach, served as the head coach of the California Golden Bears from 1916 until his death and led the team to win 3 national championships; died of pneumonia (b. 1883)

== January 9, 1926 (Saturday) ==
- A band of 20 Mexican rebels, under the command of Colonel Manuel Núñez, opened fire aboard a train traveling from Guadalajara to Mexico City, then looted and burned the cars. The train had passed Vista Hermosa de Negrete and was approaching Yurécuaro in the state of Michoacan when the bandits brought it to a halt. Afterward, the bandits escaped on the engine, "carrying away 300,000 pesos in plunder" (equivalent to about U.S.$150,000) of cash and bar silver. Although initial reports reported that as many as 50 guards and passengers were murdered, the figure was later revised to 11 deaths, all of whom had been guards.
- The Navy League of the United States released a report finding the United States Navy to be unprepared for war and well short of the tonnage limitation set by the Washington Naval Treaty.
- In Botswana, at the time the Bechuanaland Protectorate, Tshekedi Khama was named as the regent for his 4-year-old nephew, future Botswana president Seretse Khama and Kgosi (monarch) of the ruling Bamangwato people. Tshkedi would serve as the de facto ruler of the Bechuanaland natives until 1949, when he would step aside in light of the reaffirmation of Seretse's rule by the tribal elders.
- Born:
  - James M. Beggs, American businessman and consultant, served as Administrator of NASA from 1981 to 1985; in Pittsburgh, United States (d. 2020)
  - Chérifa, Algerian singer and songwriter; as Ouardia Bouchemlal, at Ait Hallia, El Main, French Algeria (present-day Algeria) (d. 2014)
- Died: William Henry Warren, 73, Australian engineer, lawyer and professor (b. 1852)

== January 10, 1926 (Sunday) ==
- Hernando Siles was sworn into office as the new President of Bolivia after having won the presidential election held on December 1, 1925.
- Voting was held in the European principality of Liechtenstein for all 15 seats of the nation's parliament, the Landtag. The Christlich-Soziale Volkspartei (CSV) won 8 seats for a majority while the Fortschrittliche Bürgerpartei (FBP) won 6. A runoff election took place on January 24 for the other seat, which went to the Christian Socialists for a 9 to 6 majority, down from the 11 to 4 it had previously held.
- In the U.S., the capsizing of the four-masted schooner Prinz Valdemar blocked all ship traffic in and out of Biscayne Bay and the harbor of Miami, Florida. The 35-year old Danish barkentine ship had been sold to investors for conversion to a floating hotel and was stranded on a sandbar at low tide when it became top-heavy and tipped over. The 80 construction workers on board were rescued unharmed but two ocean liners, the George Washington and the Seneca, were unable to leave, and other ships at sea were unable to sail in.
- Mexican federal troops tracked down bandits responsible for the previous evening's train massacre to a ranch in Jalisco and engaged them in a shootout. Most of the rebels were killed in the fighting, and eight who were captured were immediately executed. All the stolen loot was recovered.
- A tournament to decide the championship of Gaelic football was won by the Galway GAA Tribesmen at Croke Park in Dublin. Because of problems in going beyond the semifinal round of the 1925 tournament, no final had been held and Galway had been declared champion by the Gaelic Athletic Association (GAA) on December 5. A tournament of four teams was organized, and Galway defeated Wexford GAA, 3–2 to 1-2 (equivalent to an 11 to 5 win).
- Born: Carol Duvall, American TV personality whose arts and crafts program, The Carol Duvall Show ran for 12 seasons on the HGTV cable channel; as Carol-Jean Reihmer, in Milwaukee, United States (d. 2023)

== January 11, 1926 (Monday) ==
- U.S. Representative John W. Langley of Kentucky's 10th Congressional District, resigned after 19 years in Congress, because the U.S. Supreme Court had affirmed his jail sentence for violating the prohibition laws by illegally selling alcohol to New York bootleggers in organized crime. Over three years during the prohibition era, Congressman Langley had deposited $115,000 in his bank account while earning only $22,500 in salary.
- The Whittemore Gang robbed Belgian diamond merchants Albert Goudris and Emanuel Veerman on West 48th Street in Manhattan, making off with $175,000 in gems, the largest haul of their crime spree. Sentenced to two years in prison, he would be pardoned by President Calvin Coolidge at the end of 1928.
- One of the most heavily promoted U.S. films of the year, the comedy The American Venus, starring Esther Ralston, Ford Sterling and Douglas Fairbanks Jr., and featuring the reigning Miss America, Fay Lanphier, had its world premiere for the public, appearing at the home of the Miss America pageant, Atlantic City, New Jersey.
- Born: Lev Dyomin, Russian cosmonaut who was launched into space on Soyuz 15 in 1974; in Moscow, Soviet Union (present-day Russia) (d. 1998)

== January 12, 1926 (Tuesday) ==
- The Director of the Pasteur Institute in Paris, Dr. Émile Roux, announced the discovery of an antitoxin vaccine that could provide immunity against tetanus. The serum, developed by Dr. Gaston Ramon and Dr. Christian Zoeller of the institute, had been successfully tested on more than 100 patients.
- Toray Industries, one of the world's largest producers of synthetic fiber and the largest producer of carbon fiber, was created in Japan as Toyo Rayon Co., Ltd., a subsidiary of Mitsui & Co., with Mitsui managing director Yunosuke Yasukawa serving as the new company's first chairman.

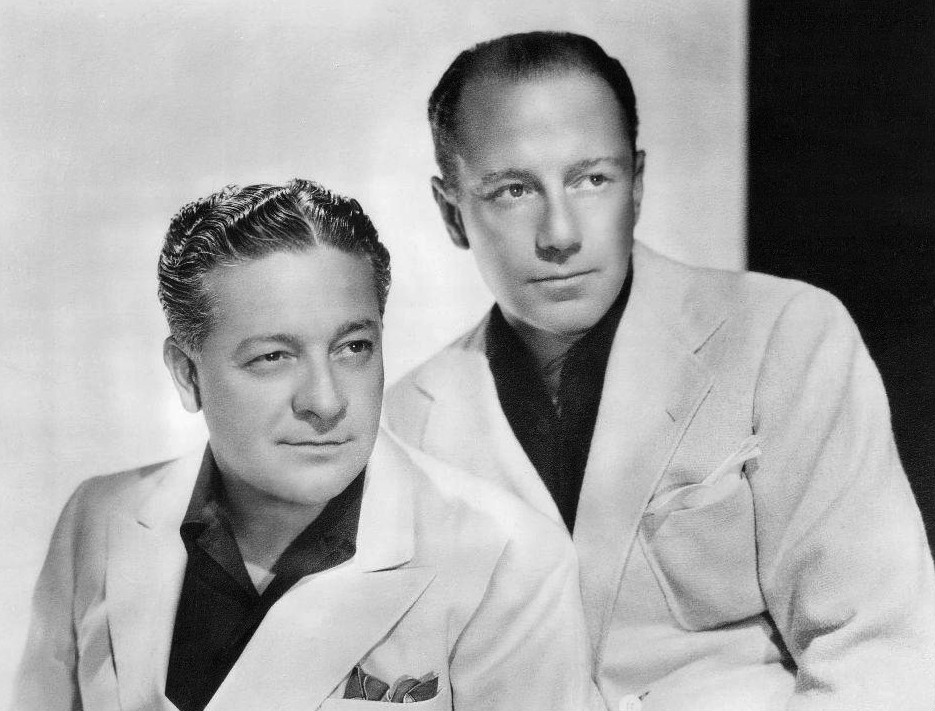
Correll and Gosden

- Freeman Gosden and Charles Correll premiered their radio program Sam 'n' Henry, in which the two white performers portray two black characters from Harlem looking to "strike it rich in the big city". It was a precursor to Gosden and Correll's more popular later program, Amos 'n' Andy.
- Born: Ray Price, American country music singer; as Noble Raymond Price, near Perryville, Texas (d. 2013)

== January 13, 1926 (Wednesday) ==
- A mine explosion in Wilburton, Oklahoma, killed 91 coal miners.
- The Shura Council of the Hijaz, the first legislative assembly in what would become the Kingdom of Saudi Arabia, was organized by King Ibn Saud and Saud's 19-year-old son, Faisal bin Abdulaziz Al Saud (who would become King Faisal almost 40 years later) served as the first council chairman.
- Britain and Iraq signed a new treaty extending their relations for 25 years or until Iraq joined the League of Nations.
- Born:
  - Michael Bond, English author, creator of the Paddington Bear series; as Thomas Michael Bond, in Newbury, Berkshire, England (d. 2017)
  - Sumner Shapiro, U.S. Navy Rear Admiral, served as the Director of the Office of Naval Intelligence from 1978 to 1982; in Nashua, New Hampshire, United States (d. 2006)

== January 14, 1926 (Thursday) ==
- African railway workers at the British African colony of Sierra Leone began a strike that would last for six weeks.
- German Foreign Minister Gustav Stresemann warned that the Locarno Pact was at risk of breaking down, as Germany accused the Allied powers of infringing on the limits on troops they were allowed to station in the Rhineland.
- A total solar eclipse took place that was visible in the Southern Hemisphere from French Equatorial Africa (corresponding to the Central African Republic and the British colonies of Uganda, Kenya and the Sudan, as well as Italian Somalia, the Seychelles islands, the Dutch East Indies (now Indonesia), Sarawak and North Borneo (in Malaysia) and the Philippines. Scientists gathered in Sumatra to perform observational experiments, including an evaluation of Albert Einstein's theory of general relativity.
- The Ivo Tijardović operetta Little Floramye (Mala Floramye) was given its premiere performance, making its debut in the Yugoslavian (now Croatian) city of Split.
- Born:
  - Wu Zhaonan, Taiwanese and American xiangsheng comedian and cook known for creating the recipe for "Mongolian barbecue"; in Beijing, Republic of China (present-day China) (d. 2018)
  - Tom Tryon, American actor and writer; as Thomas Tryon, in Hartford, Connecticut, United States (d. 1991)
  - K. B. Tilak, Indian Telugu language and Hindi language film director and producer, known for Chhoti Bahu (1971, Hindi) and Eedu Jodu (1963, Telugu); as Korlipara Balagangadhara Tilak, in Denduluru, Madras Presidency, British India (present-day Andhra Pradesh, India) (d. 2010)
  - Frank Aletter, American actor and comedian known for Bringing Up Buddy and It's About Time; in New York City, United States (d. 2009)

== January 15, 1926 (Friday) ==
- Turkish civil code: Turkey adopted the Swiss Civil Code as part of the ongoing reforms instituted by President Mustafa Kemal Atatürk.
- The film The Sea Beast, starring John Barrymore, was released.
- Born:
  - Maria Schell, Austrian-Swiss actress; in Vienna, Austria (d. 2005)
  - Rafiq Nishonov, Uzbek politician, served as the Chairman of the Presidium of the Supreme Soviet of the Uzbek SSR from 1986 to 1988, Chairman of the Uzbek Communist Party from 1988 to 1989, and as the Soviet Union's Chairman of the Soviet of Nationalities from 1989 to 1991; in Gazalkent, Uzbek SSR (present-day Uzbekistan) (d. 2023)
- Died: Louis Majorelle, 66, French furniture designer (b. 1859)

== January 16, 1926 (Saturday) ==
- A BBC comic radio play broadcast by Ronald Knox about a workers' revolution caused a panic in London. Father Ronald Knox, a former Anglican priest who had become a Roman Catholic priest, wrote and performed what was intended as a comedic skit, "Broadcasting the Barricades". Although the program was preceded by an announcement that it was fiction and not meant to be taken seriously, listeners who tuned in later were unaware that the "live" news reports of a destructive workers' revolution in London were fiction.
- The French language operetta Passionnément, by André Messager and Albert Willemetz was performed for the first time, premiering at the Théâtre de la Michodière in Paris.
- Born: Abraham Serfaty, Moroccan anti-government political activist who spent 17 years in prison for his campaign against Morocco's King Hassan II; in Casablanca, French protectorate in Morocco (present-day Morocco) (d. 2010)
- Died: Jean Georges Bouyer, 35, French World War I flying ace credited with 11 confirmed aerial victories; killed in a plane crash (b. 1891)

== January 17, 1926 (Sunday) ==
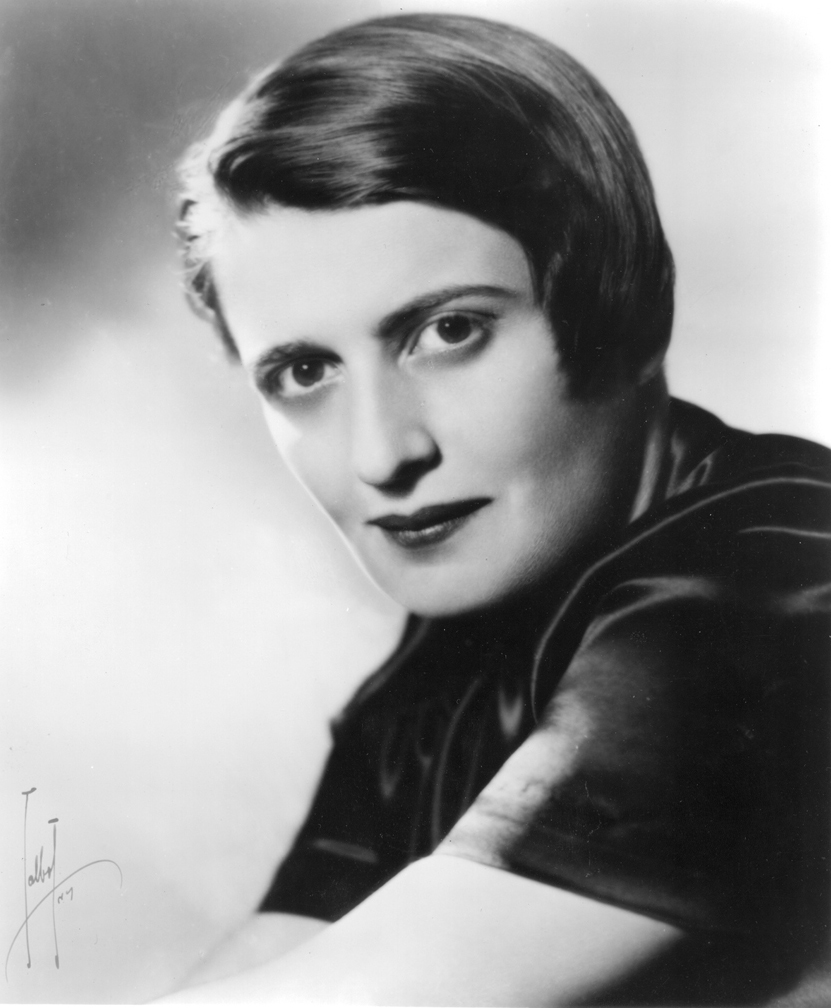
Ayn Rand

- Twenty-year-old Ayn Rand left Russia, departing from Leningrad by train. Her early life experiences in Communist Russia were a major influence on her philosophy.
- Peru's "Statue of Liberty" (Estatua de La Libertad), standing 21 feet (6.4 m) high including a 14 feet (4.3 m) pedestal, was unveiled at Plaza Libertad in Lima. Created by sculptor René Bertrand-Boutée, La Libertad was a gift from France to commemorate the 100th anniversary of Peru's independence. The lady symbolizing liberty has a torch raised high in her left hand, and carries and a laurel palm in her right hand.
- Born:
  - Moira Shearer, Scottish ballet dancer and actress; as Moira Shearer King, in Dunfermline, Scotland (d. 2006)
  - Maria d'Apparecida, Brazilian-born French mezzo-soprano opera singer; in Rio de Janeiro, Brazil (d. 2017)
  - Antonio Domingo Bussi, Argentine Army General and convicted war criminal who governed the Tucumán Province during Argentina's "Dirty War" (Guerra sucia); in Victoria, Entre Ríos, Argentina (d. 2011)
- Died: Liisu Mägi, 94, Estonian folk singer, songwriter and preservationist credited with writing down thousands of local folk songs (b. 1831)

== January 18, 1926 (Monday) ==
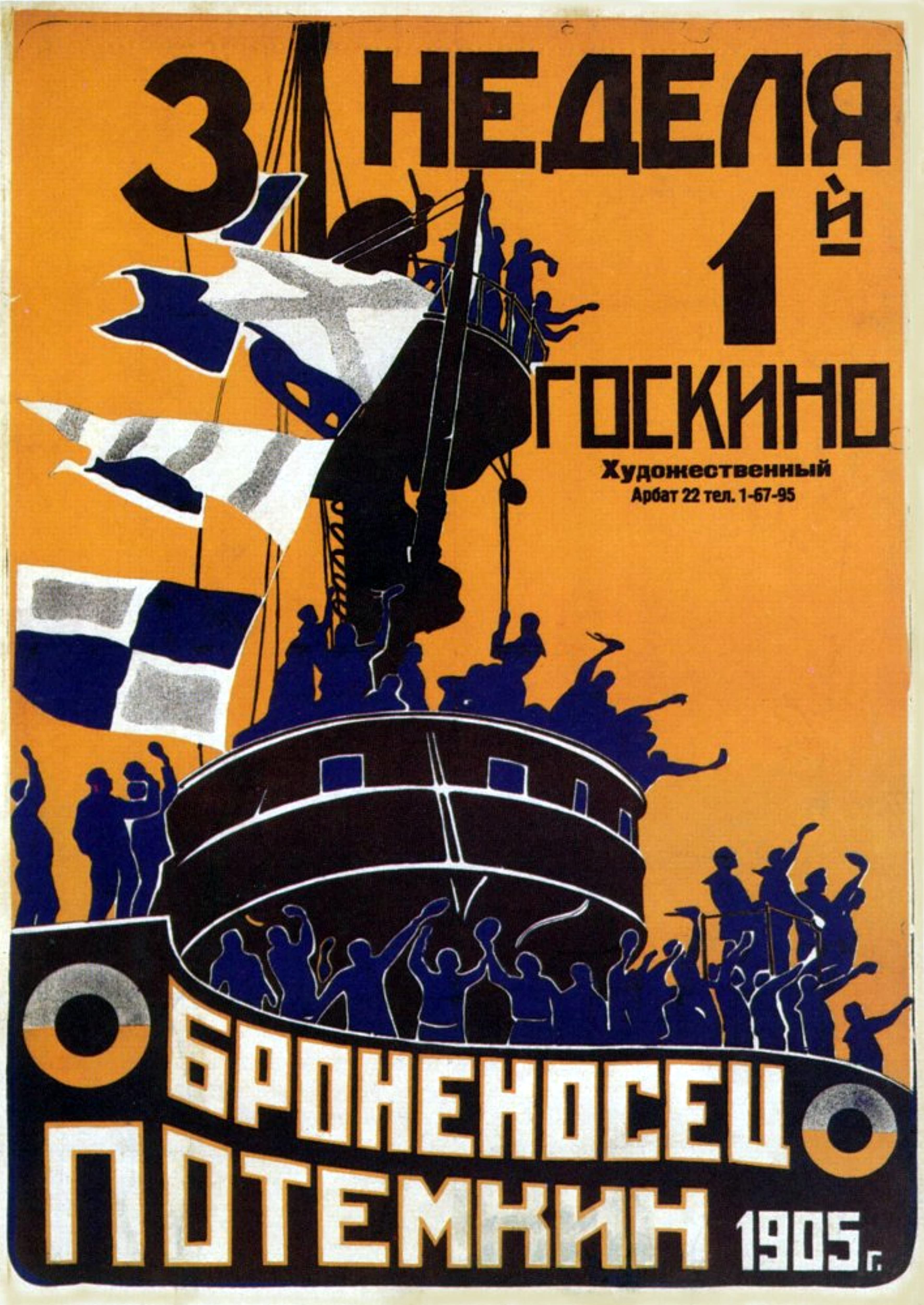
The original movie poster for Bronenoseya Potemkin

- Battleship Potemkin, the renowned Russian film directed by Sergei Eisenstein, was given its premiere, with the first public viewing held at Moscow's Goskinoteatre.
- In the U.S. state of Alabama, African-American votings rights activist Indiana Little led several hundred black men and women on a march to the Jefferson County registrar's office in Birmingham to demand the right to register on the same terms as white people, after having been denied a week earlier. After refusing to leave, Little was arrested for disturbing the peace, and released after posting a $300 bond. She would not be registered to vote until more than 30 years later, in 1957.
- The Italianization of South Tyrol escalated as the government issued a decree requiring citizens of South Tyrol, which had been ceded to Italy by Austria after World War One, to "Italianize" any names and titles of nobility "which have been translated into other languages or deformed by foreign orthography or foreign endings" by the primarily German-speaking population. Failure to comply carried a fine of up to 1,000 lira. Among the changes were that "Bozen" had become "Bolzano", Brixen was "Bressanone", Schlanders was "Silandro" and Kastelruth was "Castelrotto".
- Born: Salah Zulfikar, Egyptian film actor and producer known for multiple hit films, including Aghla Min Hayati (Dearer than my Life) as co-star with his future wife Shadia; in El Mahalla El Kubra, Kingdom of Egypt (present-day Egypt) (d. 1993)

== January 19, 1926 (Tuesday) ==
- Lev Karakhan, the Soviet ambassador to China, sent a protest to the Chinese Foreign Ministry warning of "serious consequences" if a dispute over the two countries' joint management of the Chinese Eastern Railway was not resolved. Manchurian warlord Zhang Zuolin had been seizing parts of the railway line and arresting Soviet officials in retaliation for a decision that made Chinese troops pay half-fare instead of being allowed to ride for free. The dispute was a precursor to the Sino Soviet Conflict of 1929.
- Led by Buenaventura Durruti, the Los Errantes gang of bank robbers, a group of seven anarchists from Spain who worked their way southward through Latin America to commit heists, made their final bank robbery, as the group struck a branch of the Banco Central de la República Argentina at San Martín, taking 64,085 Argentine pesos and killing one bank employee. They escaped Argentina to Uruguay and then sailed to France, where they would be arrested in July.
- Born:
  - Fritz Weaver, American actor, winner of the 1970 Tony Award for Best Actor in a Play for Child's Play; in Pittsburgh, United States (d. 2016)
  - Wang Hai, Chinese fighter pilot and general, was a flying ace with nine victories in the Korean War; in Yantai, Shandong province, Republic of China (present-day China) (d. 2020)
- Died:
  - Leopoldo Eleuteri, 31, Italian World War One fighter ace with seven victories; killed in a midair collision with the pilot of another fighter during a combat simulation (b. 1894)
  - Frances Simpson, 68-69, English cat fancier known for her bestselling book The Book of the Cat (1903) (b. c. 1857)

== January 20, 1926 (Wednesday) ==
- Martin James Durkin, hunted by the U.S. Federal Bureau of Investigation for murder after the October 11 killing of FBI Special Agent Edwin C. Shanahan, was arrested after having been recognized by a railroad ticket agent in Alpine, Texas. Durkin had boarded a train at San Antonio, Texas to travel to St. Louis, and was picked up after the FBI asked the train to stop at Webster Groves, Missouri, outside of St. Louis city limits. Durkin was convicted of murder, but spared the death penalty, and would spend 28 years in prison until his 1954 parole.
- German Chancellor Dr. Hans Luther formed his second cabinet, a minority coalition involving the Centre Party, German People's Party and National People's Party.
- A gale in the Atlantic Ocean threatened multiple ships near New York City, stopping ocean liners from continuing their voyages. The storm was threatening to sink two British freighters that had sent out S.O.S. distress calls, SS Antinoe and SS Laristan. The U.S. luxury liner SS President Roosevelt went to the rescue of the Antinoe. Although initial reports were that the SS Antinoe sank in the storm, the President Roosevelt, commanded by Captain George Fried, remained in the heavy seas and would complete rescue of all 25 of the Antinoe crew on January 28.
- Born:
  - Patricia Neal, U.S. actress; in Packard, Kentucky (d. 2010)
  - David Tudor, U.S. pianist and composer; in Philadelphia (d. 1996)

== January 21, 1926 (Thursday) ==
- The Chinese Eastern Railway dispute worsened as the general manager of the railway, A.N. Isonov, was arrested by Zhang Zuolin's troops.
- The Belgian Parliament approved the Locarno Treaties.
- The D.H. Lawrence novel The Plumed Serpent was published.
- Born:
  - Steve Reeves, U.S. bodybuilder and actor; in Glasgow, Montana (d. 2000)
  - Franco Evangelisti, Italian composer; in Rome (d. 1980)
  - Stanley F. Schmidt, American aerospace engineer who pioneered the Schmidt–Kalman filter algorithm used for space navigation, most notably in the Apollo spacecraft; in Hollister, California (d. 2015)
- Died:
  - Camillo Golgi, 82, Austrian physician, pathologist, scientist and 1906 Nobel Prize laureate, known also for his discovery of Golgi's method of visualizing nerve tissue (1873), the Golgi apparatus in cellular biology (1898). The Golgi tendon organ and the Golgi tendon reflex and several types of nerve cells are named in his honor as well.Golgi tendon organ.
  - Marie C. Brehm, 66, American prohibitionist for the Woman's Christian Temperance Union and the first woman to be nominated for vice president in a U.S. presidential election (as candidate for the Prohibition Party as the running mate of Herman P. Faris in the 1924 election) died three weeks after being injured at the January 1 collapse of the grandstand at the Tournament of Roses parade in Pasadena, California

== January 22, 1926 (Friday) ==
- The Manila Symphony Orchestra, organized by Alexander Lippay, held its first concert, premiering at the Manila Grand Opera House.
- Soviet Foreign Minister Georgy Chicherin sent a threatening note to the Manchurian government seeking "permission" for the Soviet army to enter Manchuria if the Chinese Eastern Railway's administration was not restored. Manchuria responded by agreeing to comply, ending the crisis.
- Born: Peter J. Hall, British-born American costume designer for theatre; in Bristol (d. 2010)

== January 23, 1926 (Saturday) ==
- Eugene O'Neill's play The Great God Brown opened at the Greenwich Theatre.
- The Shrine Auditorium opened in Los Angeles.
- Born: Bal Thackeray, Indian journalist and founder of the far-right Shiv Sena political party, which he led from 1966 to 2012; in Poona, Bombay Presidency, British India (now Pune, Maharashtra state) (d. 2012)
- Died:
  - Joseph Carl Breil, 55, American stage director, conductor and composer known for being one of the first film score arrangers for music to be played by a musician to accompany the showing of a silent film, died of a heart attack. Breil, whose death occurred two months after the failure of his opera Der Asra, is known for "The Perfect Song" used in the 1915 film The Birth of a Nation and for his 1919 opera The Legend
  - Désiré-Joseph Mercier, 74, Belgian cardinal
  - Yordan Tsitsonkov, Bulgarian assassin who was in a maximum security prison serving a 20-year prison sentence in Czechoslovakia for the 1923 murder of former Bulgarian Internal Affairs Minister Rayko Daskalov, hanged himself.

== January 24, 1926 (Sunday) ==
- The first successful journey across Africa by motorcar from south to north was completed by Chaplin Court Treatt and Stella Court Treatt as they arrived in Cairo in Egypt, one year, four months and 11 days after they had departed from Cape Town and South Africa on September 13, 1924.
- The Third International Radio Week began, featuring transatlantic tests of distance reception. Listeners in New York and Chicago reported successful reception of English and South American radio broadcasts.
- The Federación de Fútbol de Chile (FFCh), the national body regulating professional soccer football (fútbol) in the nation of Chile, was created by a merger of the older Asociación de Football de Chile with another Federación that had been formed in the early 1920. The merger was forced by the 1925 decision of FIFA to expel the nation of Chile. The FFCh ovrsees the nation's soccer football leagues, including the highest level, the 16-team Liga de Primera, created in 1933.
- Born:
  - Admiral Alfredo Poveda, President of Ecuador from 1976 to 1979 as chairman of the three-member junta, the Consejo Supremo de Gobierno; in Ambato (d. 1990)
  - Denis Bray, Hong Kong-born British colonial official and Secretary for Home Affairs from 1973 to 1977 (d. 2005)
  - Irwin Russell, American entertainment lawyer and agent; in New York City (d. 2013)
  - Ruth Asawa, American modern sculptor; in Norwalk, California (d. 2013)
  - Raymond Jacobs; U.S. Marine Corps sergeant and the last surviving veteran of the flag raising on Mount Surabachi at the Battle of Iwo Jima; in Bridgeport, Connecticut (d. 2008)

== January 25, 1926 (Monday) ==
- A strike of textile workers that would eventually be carried out by 15,000 employees in the U.S. city of Passaic, New Jersey was triggered by the firing of an employee by the Botany Worsted Mills in retaliation for his attempt to organize workers to join the Trade Union Educational League (TUEL). The TUEL was a front for the Workers Party of America, later the Communist Party USA.
- Sir Berkeley Moynihan, an eminent British surgeon, spoke at the Leeds Luncheon Club on behalf of the British Empire Cancer Campaign, which had launched a nationwide fundraiser for the Yorkshire Council of the campaign. In his speech, Moynihan startled the crowd by saying "If the law of averages holds good, 60 people in this room will die of cancer," citing statistics that one out of every six people over the age of 30 eventually succumbed to a form of cancer. Moynihan said also that cancer of the tongue was "traceable to one or both of two causes— syphilis and smoking, both of which came from America.
- Born:
  - Paul Girolami, Italian-born British businessman who served as chairman for the board of the pharmaceutical company Glaxo Laboratories from 1985 until 1994, when the company merged with Burroughs Wellcome; in near Venice (d. 2023)
  - E. B. Leisenring Jr., 85, American coal executive who served as president of Westmoreland Coal Company, the largest in the U.S. at the time, from 1961 to 1988, and as its chairman of the board from 1988 to 1998; in Bryn Mawr, Pennsylvania (d. 2011)
  - Bob Clarke, American illustrator; in Mamaroneck, New York (d. 2013)

== January 26, 1926 (Tuesday) ==
- Scottish inventor John Logie Baird demonstrated a mechanical television system for members of the Royal Institution and a reporter from The Times at his London laboratory.
- Galician aviator Ramón Franco began the first leg of a Trans-Atlantic flight from Las Palmas in Spain's Canary Islands to Buenos Aires in Argentina, though not a non-stop flight as would be accomplished in 1927. Franco departed from Gando Bay at 8:23 in the morning local time. There were stopovers at Gran Canaria, Cape Verde, Pernambuco, Rio de Janeiro and Montevideo along the way. The 10,270-kilometre (6,380 mi) journey would be completed in 59 hours and 39 minutes flying time.

== January 27, 1926 (Wednesday) ==
- The U.S. Senate voted, 76 to 17, in favor of joining the World Court, but with several specific reservations.
- At least 30 German Communists and 12 Monarchists were wounded in street fighting between the groups in the Charlottenburg district of Berlin, during demonstrations on the birthday of the former Kaiser, Wilhelm II. The fighting broke out as communists paraded an effigy of the ex-Kaiser hanged from a gallows. Riot police opened fire after attempts to separate the combatants were met with attacks from both sides.
- Born:
  - Fritz Spiegl, Austrian musician, journalist and broadcaster; in Zurndorf (d. 2003)
  - Ingrid Thulin, Swedish actress; in Sollefteå (d. 2004)

== January 28, 1926 (Thursday) ==
- Reijirō Wakatsuki, the Minister of Home Affairs, was sworn into office as the new Prime Minister of Japan upon the death of the 66-year-old Premier, Takaaki Katō, who succumbed to influenza which he had contracted five days earlier.
- The United States Lines luxury liner SS President Roosevelt, commanded by Captain George Fried, completed the rescue of all 25 crew of the British cargo ship SS Antinoe, while a German ship, Bremen, had saved the lives of the other sinking freighter, Laristan. Captain Fried was praised for his persistence in locating the Antinoe and directing its rescue, which was carried by First Officer Robert Miller, who led both trips of a rescue boat to save the British crew; two of the crew of the Roosevelt had died in the initial attempt.
- American swimmer Ethel Lackie set the new world record for the women's 100m freestyle, completed in 1 minute, 10.0 seconds to surpass the mark held by fellow American Mariechen Wehselau in 1924.
- In Brussels, the funeral was held for Belgian national hero and cleric Cardinal Désiré-Joseph Mercier, who had died on January 23. Among the dignitaries attending were King Albert of Belgium, World War One French hero Marshal Ferdinand Foch, the English Archbishop of Canterbury and Cardinal Louis-Ernest Dubois. Thousands of mourners lined the streets of Brussels to watch the funeral procession.
- Born:
  - Chua Kim Yeow, Singaporean politician and second-place finisher in the 1993 Singaporean presidential election and the nation's Accountant General from 1961 to 1979; in Chinatown, City of Singapore, Straits Settlements (d. 2016)
  - Jimmy Bryan, American race car driver, winner of the U.S. open-wheel car racing championship in 1954, 1956 and 1957, and the 1958 Indianapolis 500; in Phoenix, Arizona (killed in racing accident, 1960)
  - Armando Silvestre, U.S.-born Mexican film and TV actor; in San Diego (d. 2024)
  - Harold Gonsalves, American Medal of Honor honoree and U.S. Marine Corps Private First Class of Portuguese ancestry; in Alameda, California (killed in the Battle of Okinawa, 1945)
- Died:
  - Ernest Troubridge, 63, Royal Navy officer
  - Gustave Rives, 67, French architect
  - George Bernard Roskell, 76, Australian architect

== January 29, 1926 (Friday) ==
- The colonial administration of the French protectorate of Tunisia, led by the Resident General, Lucien Saint, promulgated the "scoundrel decrees" (décrets scélérats) against Tunisian nationalists working toward Tunisia's independence from France. Under the decrees, the first exclusively Tunisian trade union, the Confédération générale des travailleurs tunisiens (CGTT), led by Mohamed Ali El Hammi, and all nationalist newspapers (including Ifriqiya, Al-Asr, Al-Jadid and Le Libéral), were banned.
- Violette Neatley Anderson became the first African-American woman to be admitted to practice law before the United States Supreme Court.
- Born:
  - Abdus Salam, Pakistani theoretical physicist and Nobel Prize laureate for his contributions to finding the electroweak interaction in particle physics; in Jhang, Punjab Province, British India (d. 1996)
  - Bob Falkenburg, American-born Brazilian entrepreneur and tennis player who won the 1948 Wimbledon men's singles championship and later founded the Brazilian fast food restaurant Bob's; in New York City (d. 2022)
- Died: Billy Golden (stage name for William Shires), 67, popular American actor, comedian and singer, known for his blackface minstrel shows imitating African-Americans to entertain white audiences. He was also a recording artist from 1891 to 1919.

== January 30, 1926 (Saturday) ==
- Reijirō Wakatsuki, Japan's Minister of Home Affairs, formed a new government as Prime Minister of Japan, replacing Katō Takaaki, who had died two days earlier.
- In the U.S., a gas explosion killed 27 miners in Mossboro, Alabama, while another 26 escaped unhurt.
- The Allied occupation of the first zone of the Rhineland in Germany formally ended. At 3:00 in the afternoon, local time, the British, French and Belgians in the zone all hauled down their flags and withdrew their remaining troops in advance of much of the Rhineland's sovereignty being formally returned to Germany at the stroke of midnight.
- Died:
  - Barbara La Marr, 29, American film actress, died of complications from tuberculosis and kidney failure.
  - Harold M. Shaw, 48, American film director and secretary of the Motion Picture Directors' Association, was killed in a car accident in Los Angeles, when the car in which he was a passenger collided with another vehicle at the intersection of Sixth Street and Rossmore Avenue.
  - José Marina Vega, 75, former War Minister of Spain

== January 31, 1926 (Sunday) ==
- Nahdlatul Ulama (NU), now with 40 million members the largest Islamic organization in Indonesia, was founded in Surabaya by Hasyim Asy'ari, a follower of the orthodox Ash'ari school of Islam.
- Italy's Chamber of Deputies reinforced the personal power of Benito Mussolini by passing "Law Number 100", establishing that Italy's Prime Minister had the right to issue judicial norms without previous consultation with the parliament.
