= Lepa Radić =

Yugoslav Partisan

Lepa Radić Лепа Радић
- Лепа Радић
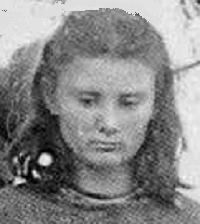
- Radić stands restrained as a Nazi officer affixes her to her hanging tree for execution
- Born: Lepa Svetozara Radić; 19 December 1925; Gašnica, Bosanska Gradiska, Yugoslavia
- Died: 8 February 1943 (aged 17); Bosanska Krupa, Yugoslavia
- Relatives: Svetozar Radić (father); Milan Radić (brother); Dara Radić (sister); Vladeta Radić (uncle)
- Military career
- Allegiance: Yugoslavia
- Branch: Yugoslav Partisans
- Service years: 1941–1943
- Units: 7th company, 2nd Krajiški Detachment
- Conflicts: World War II in Yugoslavia; Kozara Offensive; Battle of Neretva (executed)
- Awards: Order of the People's Hero

Lepa Svetozara Radić (Serbian Cyrillic: Лепа Светозара Радић; 19 December 1925 – 8 February 1943) was a Yugoslav Partisan and communist of Bosnian Serb origin who was posthumously awarded the Order of the People's Hero in 1951 for her role in the resistance movement against the Axis powers in the Second World War—becoming the youngest recipient at the time. She was executed at the age of 17 for shooting at German troops. As her captors tied the noose around her neck, they offered her a reprieve from the gallows if she would reveal her comrades' and leaders' identities. She responded that she was not a traitor and that her comrades would reveal themselves when they avenged her death.

== Early life ==
Radić was born to a Bosnian Serb family on 19 December 1925 in the village of Gašnica near Bosanska Gradiška. After graduation from the elementary school in the nearby Bistrica, she attended the first grade of Women's School of Crafts in Bosanska Krupa and completed the remaining grades at school in Bosanska Gradiška.

As a pupil, Lepa emphasized hard work and seriousness, and was also interested in reading advanced literature. She developed her core positions under the strong influence of her uncle Vladeta Radić, who was involved in the labor movement. Starting with becoming a member of the League of Communist Youth of Yugoslavia (SKOJ), she eventually joined the Communist Party of Yugoslavia in 1941 at the age of 15.

== World War II ==
On 10 April 1941, after the invasion of Yugoslavia, the Axis powers established the Independent State of Croatia, which included Bosanska Gradiška and surrounding areas.

In November 1941, 15-year-old Lepa Radić and other family members were arrested by the Ustaše, but with the help of undercover partisan associates, Lepa and her sister, Dara, managed to escape from prison on 23 December 1941. Following her escape, she joined the 7th partisan company of the 2nd Krajiški Detachment.

In February 1943, Lepa Radić was responsible for transporting the wounded in the battle of Neretva to a shelter in Grmeč. During the fight against the 7th SS Volunteer Mountain Division Prinz Eugen she was captured and moved to Bosanska Krupa where, after torture for several days in an attempt to extract information, she was sentenced to death by hanging.

=== Capture and execution ===
With the noose around her neck, she cried out: "Long live the Communist Party, and partisans! Fight, people, for your freedom! Do not surrender to the evildoers! I will be killed, but there are those who will avenge me!"

Reportedly, in her last moments at the scaffold, the Germans offered to spare Radić's life in return for her revealing the names of the Communist Party leaders and members in the shelter, but she refused their offer with the words: "I am not a traitor of my people. Those whom you are asking about will reveal themselves when they have succeeded in wiping out all you evildoers, to the last man." Lepa Radić was only 17 years old when she was publicly executed.

== Gallery ==
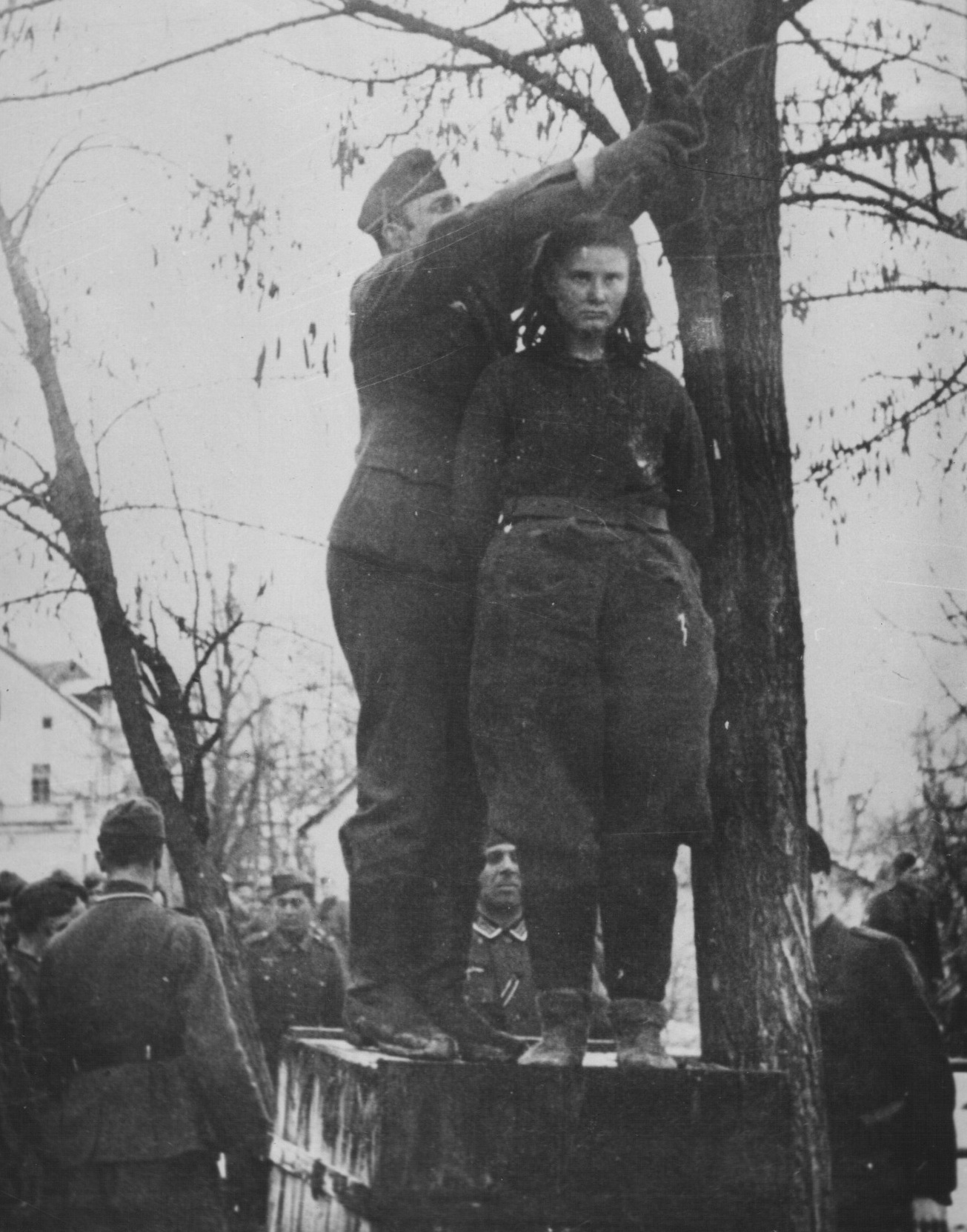
Hanging of Lepa Radić, February 1943

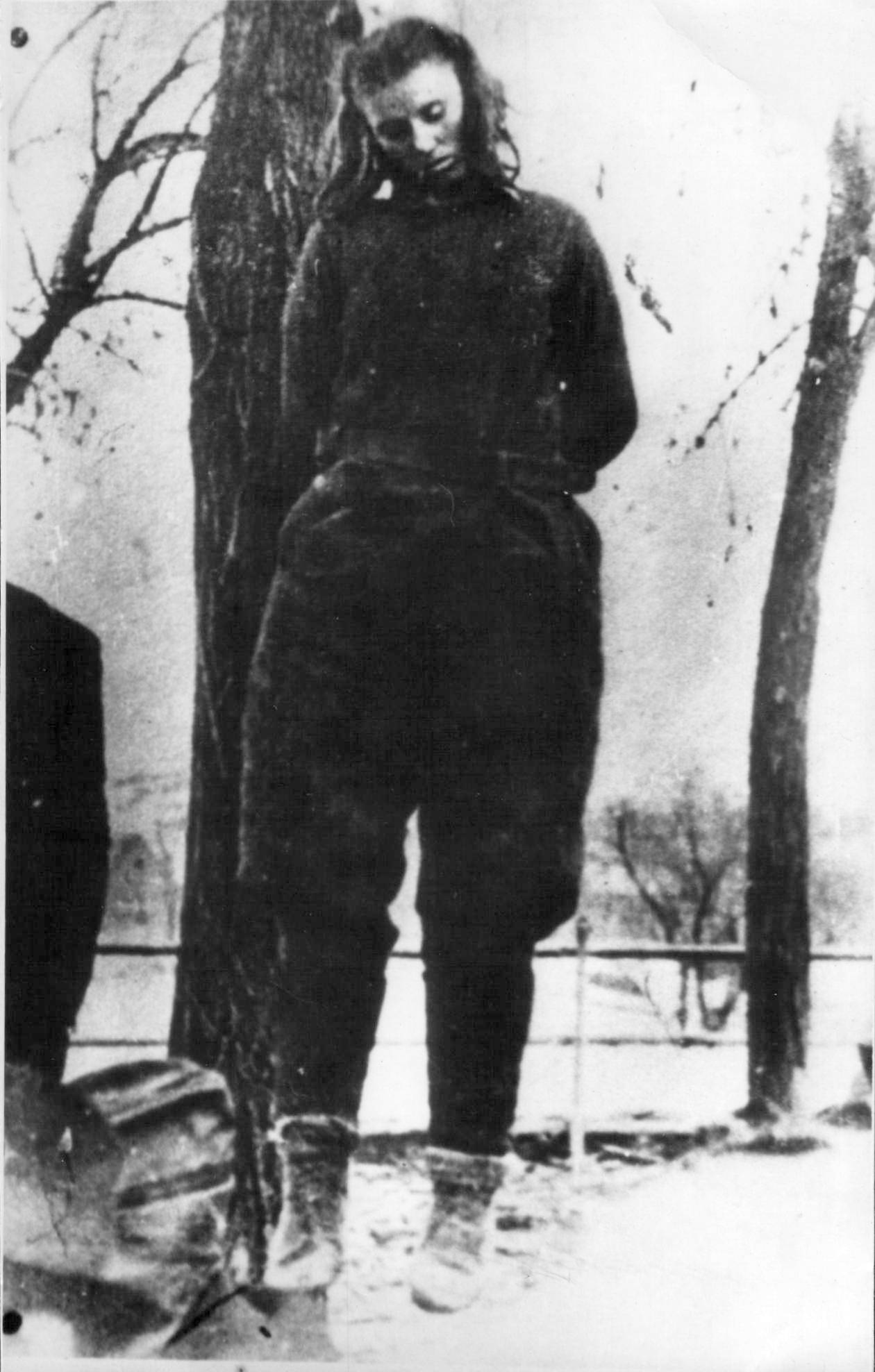
Lepa Radić hanged

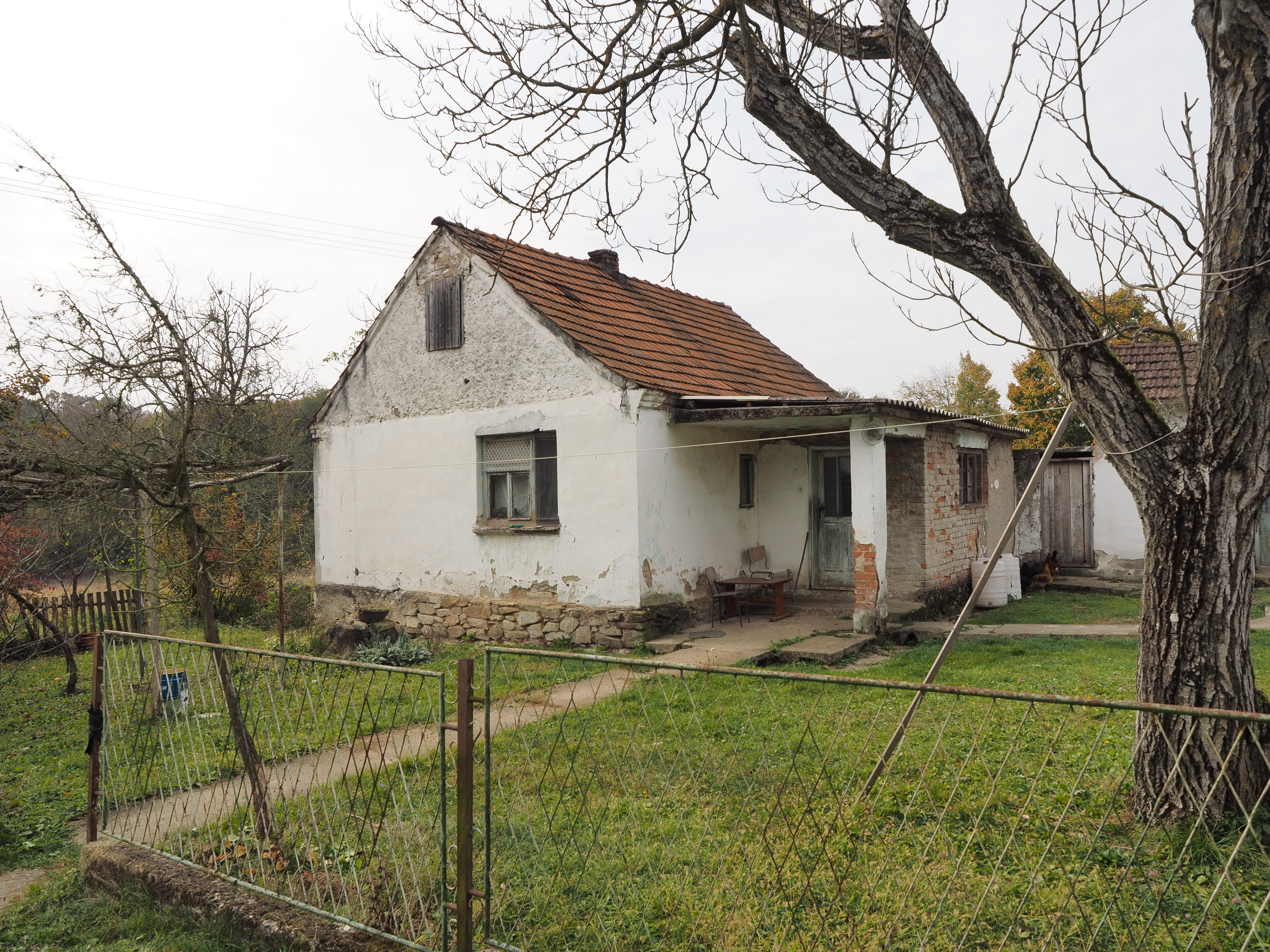
Birthplace in Gašnica, original house was destroyed in war

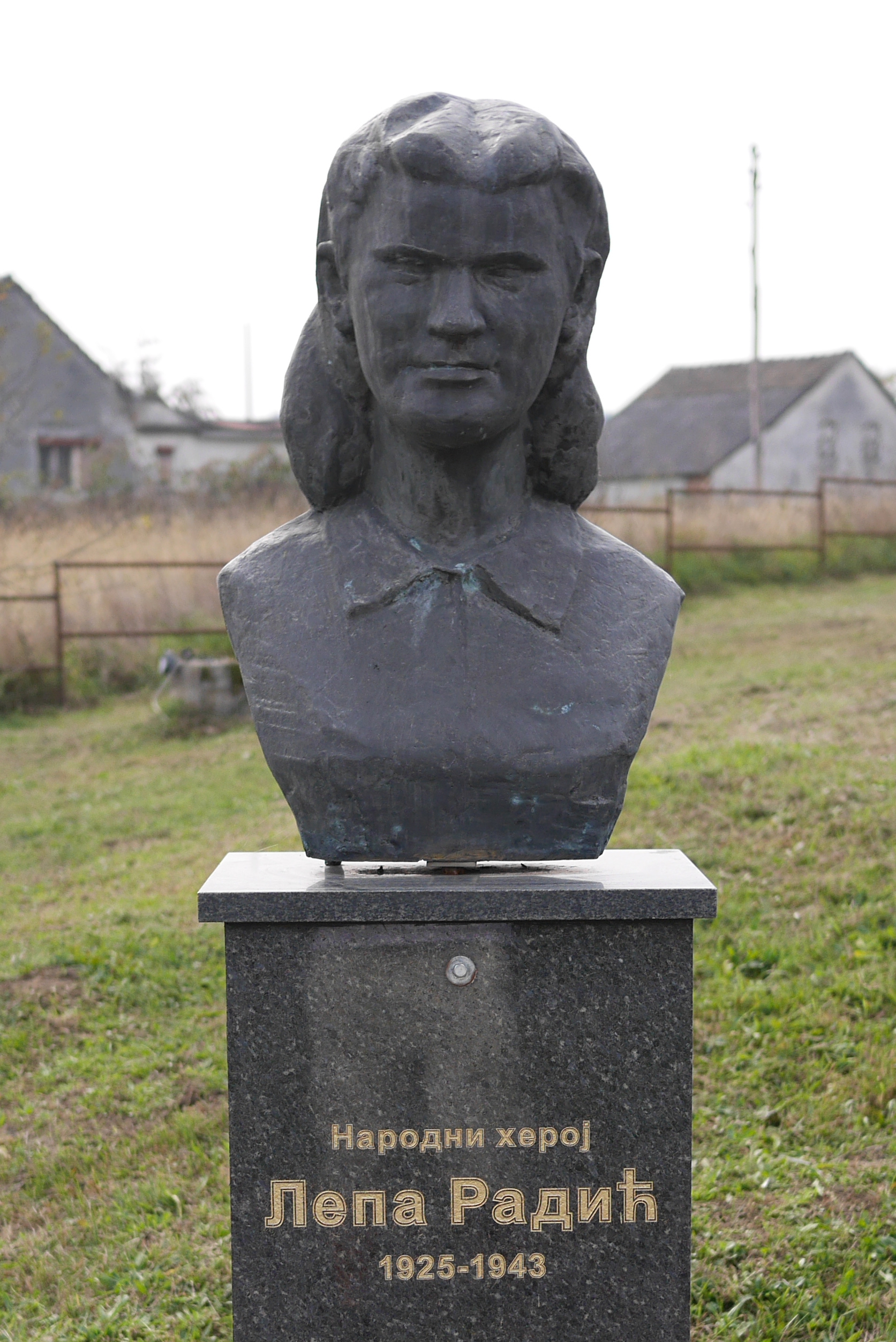
Bust of Lepa Radić in Bistrica memorial park
