= Eugen Fraenkel =

German bacteriologist

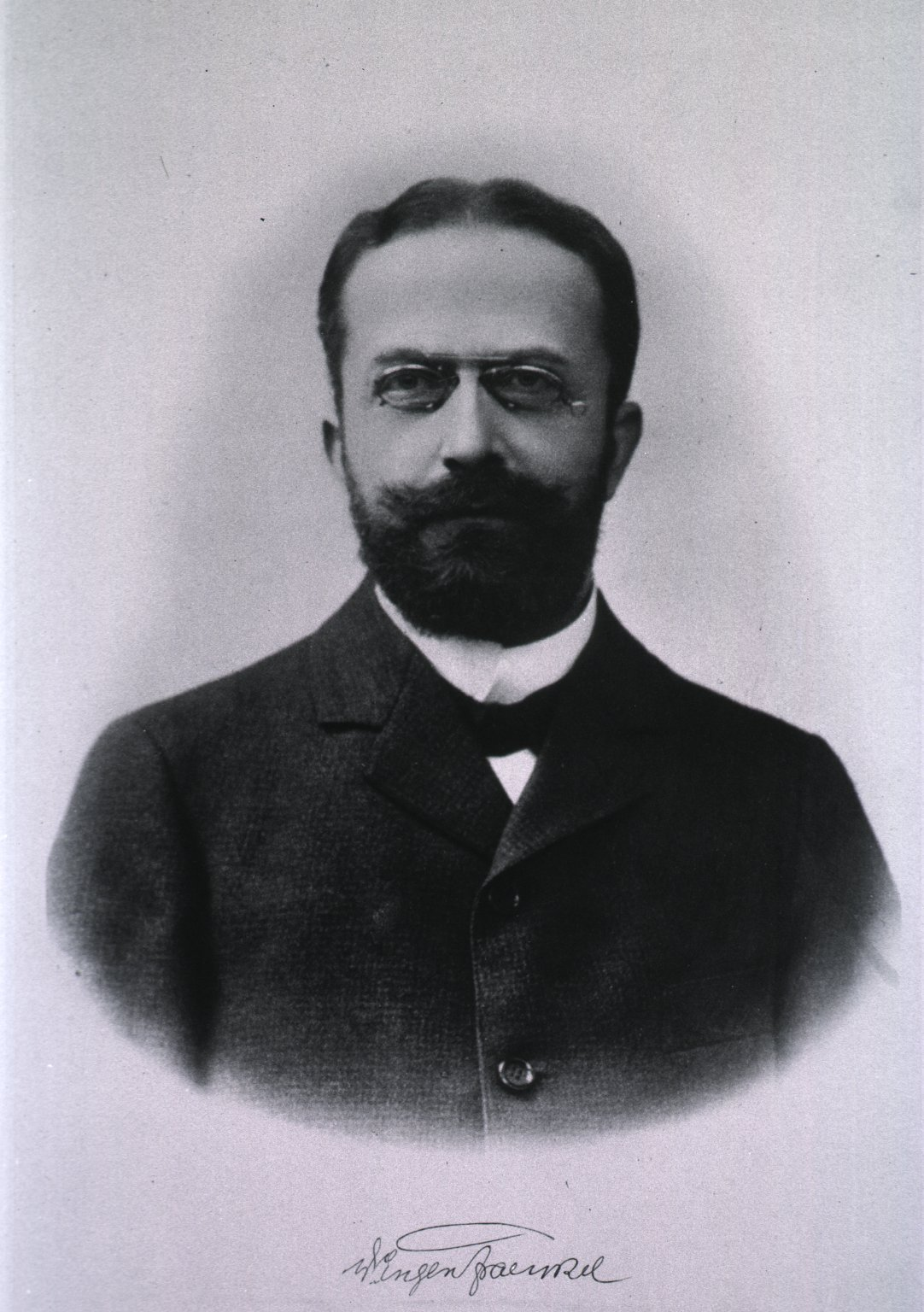
Eugen Fraenkel

Eugen Fraenkel (28 September 1853 in Neustadt i. OS, now Prudnik, Poland – 20 December 1925 in Hamburg, Germany) was a German bacteriologist.

Eugen Fraenkel worked as pathologist and bacteriologist researcher at the Eppendorf Hospital (Eppendorfer Krankenhaus) where he discovered the gas gangrene bacillus (Bacillus fraenkeli, later renamed Clostridium perfringens). He served in the German military during World War I.

Eugen Fraenkel was married to Marie Fraenkel (née Deutsch, 1861–1944) with whom he had three children: Max Fraenkel (1882–1938), Hans Fraenkel (1888–1971), and Margarete Kuttner née Fraenkel (1884–1944). Hans left Germany to work as an economist and journalist in Switzerland, his descendants living in Switzerland and Italy. Max, a physician in Hamburg, committed suicide under pressure of antisemitic chicanery. Marie perished in the Theresienstadt concentration camp, and Margarete, who had moved to Berlin, during the last gassing at Auschwitz-Birkenau concentration camp in November 1944.

== Works ==
- Ueber Nierenveränderungen nach Schwefelsäurevergiftung . [S.l.], 1893 Digital edition by the University and State Library Düsseldorf

== Sources ==
- Personal communication from Paul Kuttner, New York City, USA, son of Margarete Fraenkel née Kuttner
- Carl Crauspe: Fraenkel, Eugen in Neue Deutsche Biographie Bd.: 5, Berlin, 1961
- Paul Kuttner, An Endless Struggle : Reminiscences and Reflections, Vantage Press, 2009
