= Gašnica =

Gašnica Гашница
- Village
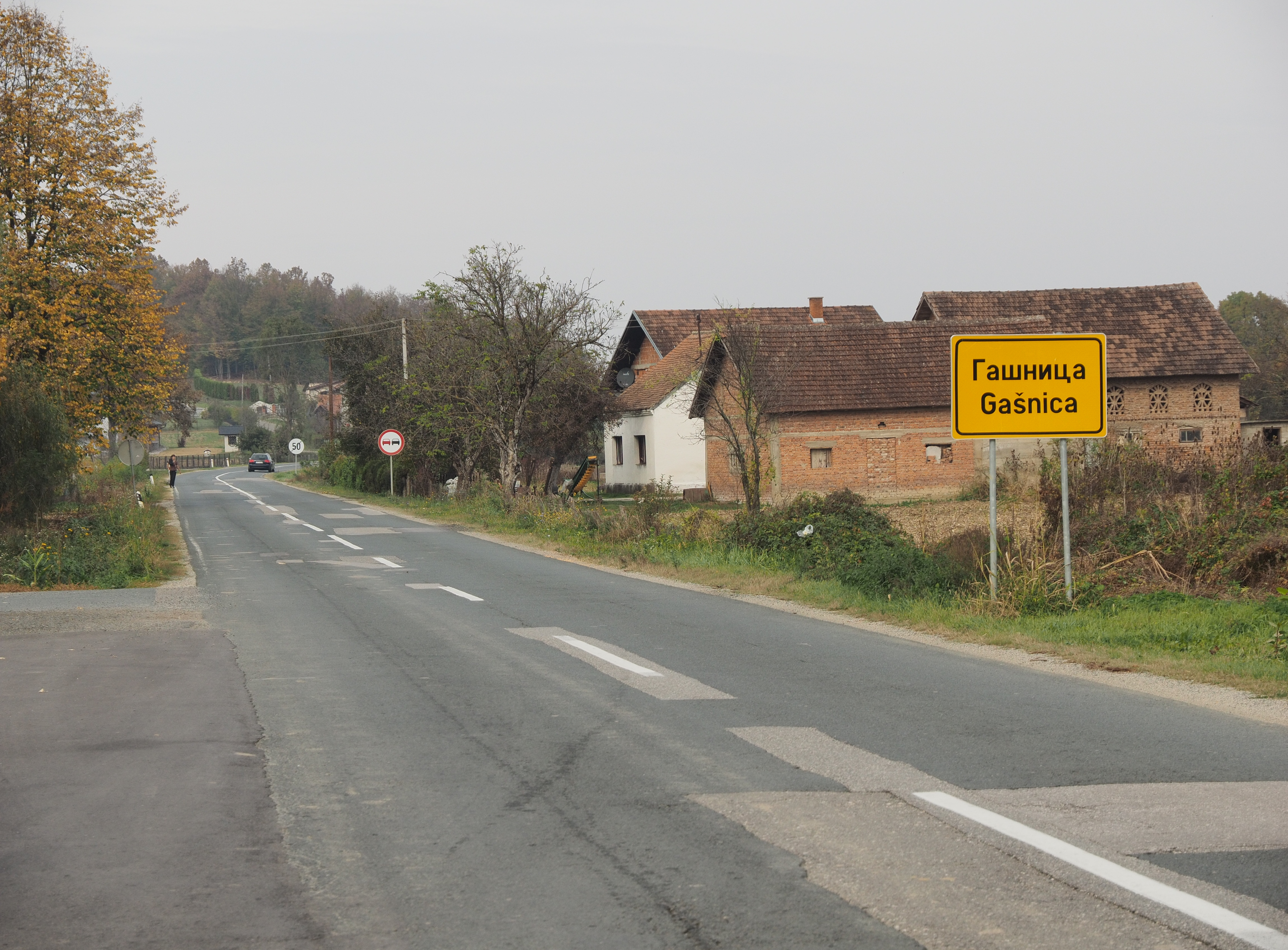

- Location within Bosnia and Herzegovina
- Coordinates: 45°10′26″N 17°05′20″E
- Country: Bosnia and Herzegovina
- Entity: Republika Srpska
- Municipality: Gradiška
- Time zone: UTC+1 (CET)
  - Summer (DST): UTC+2 (CEST)

Gašnica (Serbian Cyrillic: Гашница) is a village in the municipality of Gradiška, Republika Srpska, Bosnia and Herzegovina. It is most well-known as being the birthplace of Lepa Radić.
