= Sensory-motor map =

In robots, joining perception and action

In robotics one often combines external sensory input and motor kinematics. A Sensory Motor-Map(SMM) is a map between the perception system of the robot and an action performed by the robot. The map gives the robot an understanding of how certain motor actions affect the perceived reality by relating the kinematics and dynamics used by the robot to achieve the external sensory input.

== See also ==
- Asomatognosia – Neurological disorder characterized as loss of recognition or awareness of part of the body
- Body schema – Postural model that keeps track of limb position
- Context awareness – Ability of software to adjust to the situation of users or devices
- Deafferentation – Postural model that keeps track of limb position
- Illusions of self-motion – Misperception of one's location or movement
- Proprioception – Sense of self-movement, force, and body position
- Spatial disorientation – Inability of a person to correctly determine their body position in space
- Spatial contextual awareness – Software utilizing information from sensors, a user's activity, and maps
