= Somatoparaphrenia =

Delusion involving denial of ownership of a limb

- Specialty: Psychiatry

Somatoparaphrenia is a type of monothematic delusion where one denies ownership of a limb or an entire side of one's body. Even if provided with undeniable proof that the limb belongs to and is attached to their own body, the patient produces elaborate confabulations about whose limb it really is or how the limb ended up on their body. In some cases, delusions become so elaborate that a limb may be treated and cared for as if it were a separate being.

Somatoparaphrenia differs from a similar disorder, asomatognosia, which is characterized as loss of recognition of half of the body or a limb, possibly due to paralysis or unilateral neglect. For example, asomatognosic patients may mistake their arm for the doctor's. However, they can be shown their limb and this error is temporarily corrected.

Somatoparaphrenia has been reported to occur predominantly in the left arm of one's body, and it is often accompanied by left-sided paralysis and anosognosia (denial or lack of awareness) of the paralysis. The link between somatoparaphrenia and paralysis has been documented in many clinical cases, and while the question arises as to whether paralysis is necessary for somatoparaphrenia to occur, it has been confirmed that anosognosia is not necessary, since cases of somatoparaphrenia and paralysis with no anosognosia have been documented.

== History ==
Cases of somatoparaphrenia had been described since the end of the nineteenth century, but it wasn't until 1942 that Gerstman introduced the term somatoparaphrenic symptoms, defined as illusions or distortions concerning the perception of the affected limb or side of the body, which is believed or experienced as absent. The term was coined from the Greek: παρά, para + φρεν, phren, meaning "against the mind" and σώμα, soma (stem somat–) referring to the "body"; therefore, somatoparaphrenia is defined as a bodily delusion.

The main manifestation of somatoparaphrenia is the feeling of disownership of the contralesional body; the belief that contralesional body parts do not belong to them but to another person. Reinstatement of ownership by third-person perspective does not permanently abolish somatoparaphrenia suggesting that the subjective sense of body ownership remains dominated by an impaired first-person representation of the body that cannot be updated.

== Causes ==
It has been suggested that damage to the posterior cerebral regions (temporoparietal junction) of the cortex may play a significant role in the development of somatoparaphrenia. However, more recent studies have shown that damage to deep cortical regions such as the posterior insula and subcortical structures such as the basal ganglia, the thalamus and the white matter connecting the thalamus to the cortex may also play a significant role in the development of somatoparaphrenia. It has also been suggested that involvement of deep cortical and subcortical grey structures of the temporal lobe may contribute to reduce the sense of familiarity experienced by somatoparaphrenic patients for their paralyzed limb.

== Treatment ==
One form of treatment that has produced a more integrated body awareness is mirror therapy, in which the individual who denies that the affected limb belongs to their body looks into a mirror at the limb. Patients looking into the mirror state that the limb does belong to them; however body ownership of the limb does not remain after the mirror is taken away.

== See also ==
- Allochiria – Neurological disorder with transposition of sensations
- Body integrity dysphoria – Mental disorder characterized by a desire to be physically disabled
- Body schema – Postural model that keeps track of limb position
- Cotard delusion – Delusion that one is dead or non-existent
- Phantom limb – Sensation that an amputated or missing limb is attached
