= Asomatognosia =

Neurological disorder of body awareness

- Other names: Somatoagnosia
- Specialty: Neurology

Asomatognosia (or somatoagnosia) is a neurological disorder characterized as loss of recognition or awareness of part of the body. The failure to acknowledge, for example, a limb, may be expressed verbally or as a pattern of neglect. The limb may also be attributed to another person, a delusion known as somatoparaphrenia. However, they can be shown their limb and this error is temporarily corrected. Some authors have focused on the prevalence of hemispatial neglect in such patients.

Asomatognosia is the inability to feel, recognize, or be conscious of one's own specific body parts or bodily conditions (Whishaw, 2015). Generally, asomatognosia often arises from damage to the right parietal lobe (Whishaw, 2015). Evidence indicates that damage to the right hemisphere often results from a stroke or pre-existing hemispatial neglect, or inattention to the left visual field (Antoniello, 2016) (Keenan, 2004). Individuals who suffer from somatoparaphrenia, a specific form of asomatognosia, ignore or deny ownership of a body part contralateral to the brain lesion (Feinberg, 1990). Although this condition can affect one or both sides of the body, most patients exhibit the inability to recognize limbs/body parts (i.e., arm, leg, head, breast) on the left side of their body as their own (Keenan, 2004). While individuals with asomatognosia typically suffer large lesions across several temporoparietal sectors, those with somatoparaphrenia also suffer lesions in the right medial and orbitofrontal regions of the brain (Feinberg 2010).

== History ==
In 20th century literature, asomatognosia was often distinguished from the closely related somatoparaphrenia. According to Gerstmann's (1942) definition, asomatognosia was described as the "imperception of the affected limbs or body half, in various degrees from simple forgetting to obstinate denial of their existence." Critchley (1953) numbered various deficits of body image, including somatoparaphrenia and the rare loss of awareness of one body half corresponding to asomatognosia or hemidepersonalization. He stated that these (as well as other bodily) phenomena are not "sharply demarcated" and that it is not uncommon for one condition to merge into another. In Hécaen (1972) hemiasomatognosia and disownership were also distinguished but closely linked. Feinberg and colleagues (1990, 2010) forwarded a different definition, according to which verbal asomatognosia was defined as the denial of ownership, while somatoparaphrenia as a subtype of asomatognosia where patients also display delusional misidentification and complex confabulation.

The term asomatognosia was coined from the Greek: a (without), soma (stem somat– body or bodily), and gnosis (knowledge), thus defined as the "lack of awareness [of ownership] of one's body parts". The word Somatoagnosia (constructed from the same roots) is sometimes also used instead.

== Patient cases ==
In most commonly observed instances, individuals with this condition fail to recognize and sense their left arm after suffering lesions to the right hemisphere (Keenan, 2004). In one specific instance, a patient suffering from asomatognosia tried to throw her own left arm into a garbage can because she believed it was her husband's arm repeatedly falling on her and disrupting her sleep (Keenan, 2004). Even when patients are told that the body part belongs to them, many will deny the reality and remain firm in their belief that it is not a part of them. There is a case in which a patient with severe asomatognosia had the ability to use his right hand to trace his paralyzed left arm to his own left shoulder, but still failed to acknowledge that the left arm belonged to him (Keenan, 2004). Overall, there is an interesting phenomenon in which individuals will claim that the body part belongs to someone of the opposite gender within their family. For example, women with asomatognosia tend to claim that their left arm belongs to a man (i.e., their husband) while men claim their arm belongs to a woman, such as his daughter or wife. There also exist patients that treat the arm as a child or small animal. (Keenan, 2004)

== Related conditions ==
In addition to instances of asomatognosia in which patients deny ownership of a specific part, this condition is also associated with the following: anosognosia (unawareness or denial of illness), anosodiaphoria (indifference to illness), autopagnosia (inability to localize and name body parts), and asymbolia for pain (absence of typical reactions to pain). Out of these varieties of asomatognosia, autopagnosia is the only one in which an individual struggles to recognize the right side of their body due to lesions in the left parietal cortex (Whishaw, 2015).

== See also ==
- Body schema
