= Body schema =

Postural model that keeps track of limb position

Body schema is an organism's internal model of its own body, including the position of its limbs. The neurologist Sir Henry Head originally defined it as a postural model of the body that actively organizes and modifies 'the impressions produced by incoming sensory impulses in such a way that the final sensation of body position, or of locality, rises into consciousness charged with a relation to something that has happened before'. As a postural model that keeps track of limb position, it plays an important role in control of action.

It involves aspects of both central (brain processes) and peripheral (sensory, proprioceptive) systems. Thus, a body schema can be considered the collection of processes that registers the posture of one's body parts in space. The schema is updated during body movement. This is typically a non-conscious process, and is used primarily for spatial organization of action. It is therefore a pragmatic representation of the body’s spatial properties, which includes the length of limbs and limb segments, their arrangement, the configuration of the segments in space, and the shape of the body surface. Body schema also plays an important role in the integration and use of tools by humans.

Body schema is different from body image; the distinction between them has developed over time.

== History ==
Henry Head, an English neurologist who conducted pioneering work into the somatosensory system and sensory nerves, together with British neurologist Gordon Morgan Holmes, first described the concept in 1911. The concept was first termed "postural schema" to describe the disordered spatial representation of patients following damage to the parietal lobe of the brain. Head and Holmes discussed two schemas (or schemata): one body schema for the registration of posture or movement and another body schema for the localization of stimulated locations on the body surface. "Body schema" became the term used for the "organized models of ourselves". The term and definition first suggested by Head and Holmes has endured nearly a century of research with clarifications as more has become known about neuroscience and the brain.

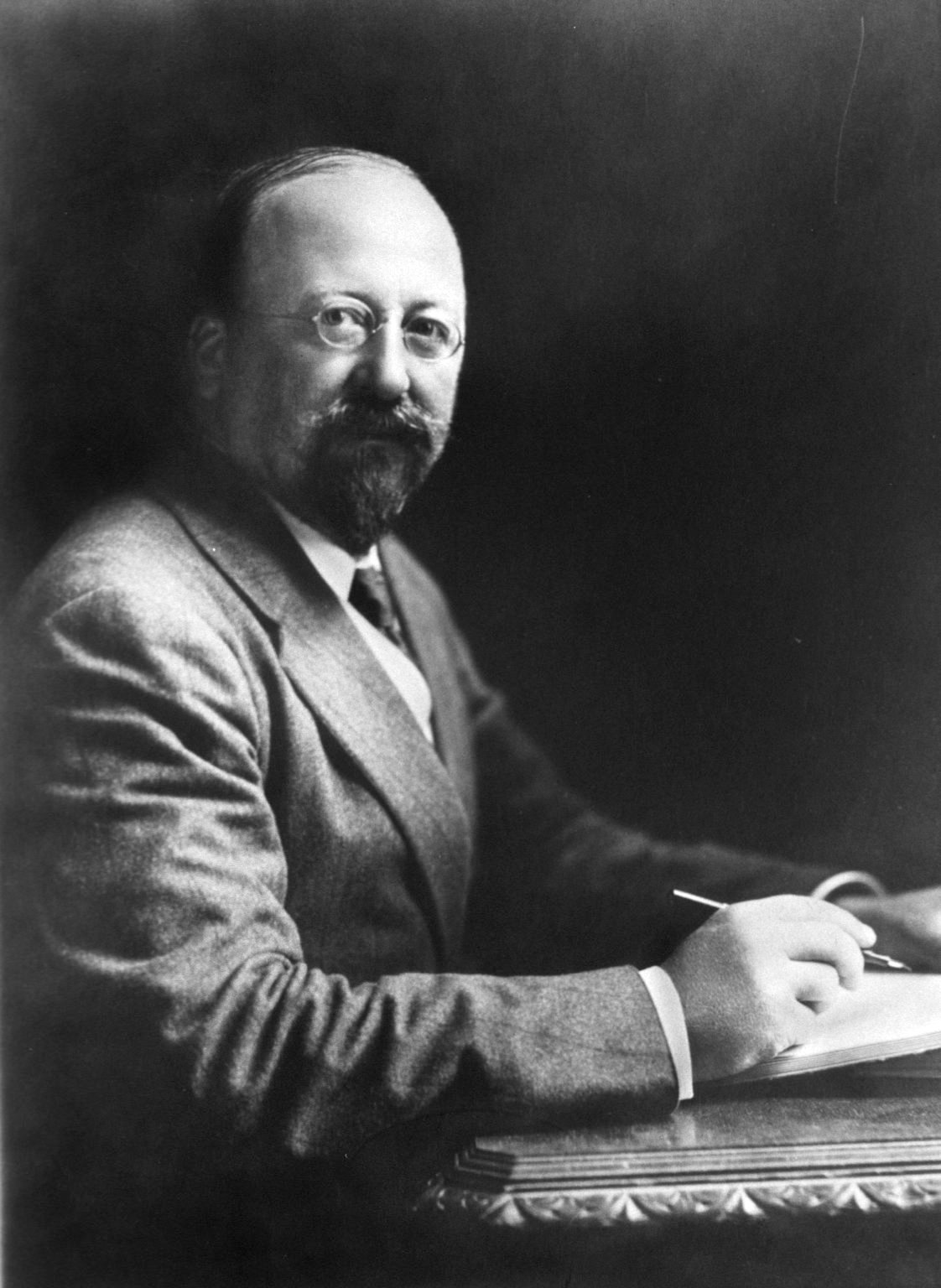
A portrait of Henry Head, the pioneering English neurologist who first defined and used the term "body schema"

== Properties ==
Neuroscientists Patrick Haggard and Daniel Wolpert have identified seven fundamental properties of the body schema. It is spatially coded, modular, adaptable, supramodal, coherent, interpersonal, and updated with movement.

=== Spatial encoding ===
The body schema represents both position and configuration of the body as a 3-dimensional object in space. A combination of sensory information, primarily tactile and visual, contributes to the representation of the limbs in space. This integration allows for stimuli to be localized in external space with respect to the body. An example by Haggard and Wolpert shows the combination of tactile sensation of the hand with information about the joint angles of the arm, which allow for rapid movements of said arm to swat a fly.

=== Modular ===
The body schema is not represented wholly in a single region of the brain. Recent fMRI (functional Magnetic Resonance Imaging) studies confirm earlier results. For example, the schema for feet and hands are coded by different regions of the brain, while the fingers are represented by a separate part entirely.

=== Adaptable ===
Plastic changes to the body schema are active and continuous. For example, gradual changes to the body schema must occur over the lifetime of an individual as they grow and absolute and relative sizes of body parts change over their life span. The development of the body schema has also been shown to occur in young children. One study showed that with these children (9-, 14-, and 19-month-olds), older children handled spoons so as to optimally and comfortably grip them for use, whereas younger children tended to reach with their dominant hand, regardless of the orientation of the spoon and eventual ease of use. Short-term plasticity has been shown with the integration of tools into the body schema. The rubber hand illusion has also shown the rapid reorganization of the body schema on the timescale of seconds, showing the high level of plasticity and speed with which the body schema reorganizes. In the Illusion, participants view a dummy hand being stroked with a paintbrush, while their own hand is stroked identically. Participants may feel that the touches on their hand are coming from the dummy hand, and even that the dummy hand is, in some way, their own hand.

=== Supramodal ===
By its nature, body schema integrates proprioceptive, (the sense of the relative position of neighbouring parts of one's body), and tactile information to maintain a three-dimensional body representation. However, other sensory information, particularly visual, can be in the same representation of the body. This simultaneous participation means there are combined representations within the body schema, which suggests the involvement of a process to translate primary information (e.g. visual, tactile, etc.) into a single sensory modality or an abstract, amodal form.

=== Coherent ===
The body schema, to function properly, must be able to maintain coherent organization continuously. To do so, it must be able to resolve any differences between sensory inputs. Resolving these inter-sensory inconsistencies can result in interesting sensations, such as those experienced during the Rubber Hand Illusion.

=== Interpersonal ===
It is thought that an individual's body schema is used to represent both one's own body and the bodies of others. Mirror neurons are thought to play a role in the interpersonal characteristics of body schema. Interpersonal projection of one's body schema plays an important role in successfully imitating motions such as hand gestures, especially while maintaining the handedness and location of the gesture, but not necessarily copying the exact motion itself.

=== Updated with movement ===
A working body schema must be able to interactively track the movements and positions of body parts in space. Neurons in the premotor cortex may contribute to this function. A class of neuron in the premotor cortex is multisensory. Each of these multisensory neurons responds to tactile stimuli and also to visual stimuli. The neuron has a tactile receptive field (responsive region on the body surface) typically on the face, arms, or hands. The same neuron also responds to visual stimuli in the space near the tactile receptive field. For example, if a neuron's tactile receptive field covers the arm, the same neuron will respond to visual stimuli in the space near the arm. As shown by Graziano and colleagues, the visual receptive field will update with arm movement, translating through space as the arm moves. Similar body-part-centered neuronal receptive fields relate to the face. These neurons apparently monitor the location of body parts and the location of nearby objects with respect to body parts. Similar neuronal properties may also be important for the ability to incorporate external objects into the body schema, such as in tool use.

== Extended body schema ==
The idea of the extended body schema is that, aside from the proprioceptive, visual, and sensory components that contribute to making a mental conception of one's body, the same processes that contribute to a body schema are also able to incorporate external objects into the mental conception of one's body. Part philosophical and part neuroscience, this concept builds upon the ideas of plasticity and adaptation to attempt to answer the question of where the body schema ends.

There is debate as to whether this concept truly exists, with one side arguing that the body schema does not extend past the body and the other side believing otherwise.

=== Supporting arguments ===
The perspective shared by those who agree with the theory of the extended body schema follow reasoning in line with such that supports theories on tool use.

In some studies, attempts at understanding tool assimilation are used to argue for the existence of the extended body schema. In an experiment involving the use and interaction with wool objects, subjects were tested on their ability to perceive afterimages of wool objects in varying contexts. Subjects accustomed their eyes to a dark room and then were shown a brief (1 millisecond) flash of light, intending to produce an afterimage effect of their arms which they held out in front of them during the experiment. Moving an arm afterwards would make the afterimage "fade" or disappear as it moved, thus indicating that the feature (the arm) was being tracked and integrated into the person's body schema. To test integration of the meaningless wool objects, subjects experienced four different contexts.

1. Subjects held the wool objects in each hand and one hand (the active hand) would move, still holding the object (the active object).
2. Using the active hand, the active wool object would be dropped once an afterimage was perceived.
3. Using the active hand, one would grab the active wool object once an afterimage was perceived.
4. The subjects were to hold onto a mechanical device which held the wool object. Once an afterimage was perceived, a subject's active hand would cause the mechanical device to drop the wool object.

In all situations but the fourth, the subjects experienced the same "fading" effect as they did with their arm alone. This would thus indicate that the wool objects had been integrated into their body schema and contributes support towards the idea of the body's using proprioceptive and visual elements to create an extended body schema. The mechanical device acted as an intermediate between the subject and the active object, and the subjects' failure to detect an afterimage in that context indicates that this concept of extension is limited to being sensitive to only what the body is directly in contact with.

=== Dissenting arguments ===
The alternate perspective is that the body is the limit of any sort of body schema.

An example of this division is found in a study and discussion on personal and extrapersonal attention, where personal relates to the body's sense of itself (the body schema) and extrapersonal relates to all external of such. Some research supports the claim that these two categories are purely distinct and do not intermingle, contrary to what the extended body schema theory describes. Evidence for such is primarily found in subjects with unilateral neglect, such as in the case of E.D.S., who was a middle-aged man with right hemisphere brain damage. When he was tested for hemispatial neglect using traditional measures such as sentence reading and cancellation tests, E.D.S. showed few signs and upon later examination showed no signs whatsoever, leading doctors to believe he was normal. However, he constantly had issues with physical therapy because he would claim to not be able to see his left leg; upon further examination, E.D.S. was known to have a particular type of hemispatial neglect that only affected the perception of his body. The motor function of the left side of his body was negatively affected though not totally compromised, yet when attempting tasks such as shaving, he would invariably not shave the left side of his face. This led some researchers to believe that there is a distinction between personal and extrapersonal neglect, which would thus reflect a similar distinction with body schema itself.

== Associated disorders ==
=== Deafferentation ===
The most direct of related disorders, deafferentation occurs due to the loss of sensory input from afferent sensory nerves, without affecting motor neurons. The most famous case of this disorder is "IW", who lost all sensory input from below the neck, resulting in temporary paralysis. He was forced to learn to control his movement all over again using only his conscious body image and visual feedback. As a result, when constant visual input is lost during an activity, such as walking, it becomes impossible for him to complete the task, which may result in falling, or simply stopping. IW requires constant attention to tasks to be able to complete them accurately, demonstrating how automatic and subconscious the process of integrating touch and proprioception into the body schema actually is.

=== Autotopagnosia ===
Autotopagnosia typically occurs after left parietal lesions. Patients with this disorder make errors which result from confusion between adjacent body parts. For example, a patient may point to their knee when asked to point to their hip. Because the disorder involves the body schema, localization errors may be made both on the patient’s own body and that of others. The spatial unity of the body within the body schema has been damaged such that it has incorrectly been segmented in relation to its other modular parts.

=== Phantom limb ===
Phantom limbs are a phenomenon which occurs following amputation of a limb from an individual. In 90–98% of cases, amputees report feeling all or part of the limb or body part still there, taking up space. The amputee may perceive a limb under full control, or paralyzed. A common side effect of phantom limbs is phantom limb pain. The neurophysiological mechanisms by which phantom limbs occur is still under debate. A common theory posits that the afferent neurons, since deafferented due to amputation, typically remap to adjacent cortical regions within the brain. This can cause amputees to report feeling their missing limb being touched when a seemingly unrelated part of the body is stimulated (such as if the face is touched, but the amputee also feels their missing arm being stroked in a specific location). Another facet of phantom limbs is that the efferent copy (motor feedback) responsible for reporting on position to the body schema does not attenuate quickly. Thus the missing body part may be attributed by the amputee to still be in a fixed or movable position.

=== Others ===
Asomatognosia, somatoparaphrenia, anosognosia, anosodiaphoria, allochiria and hemispatial neglect all involve (or in some cases involve) aspects of impaired body schema. Hemispatial neglect is not uncommon because strokes sometimes cause it.

== Tool use ==
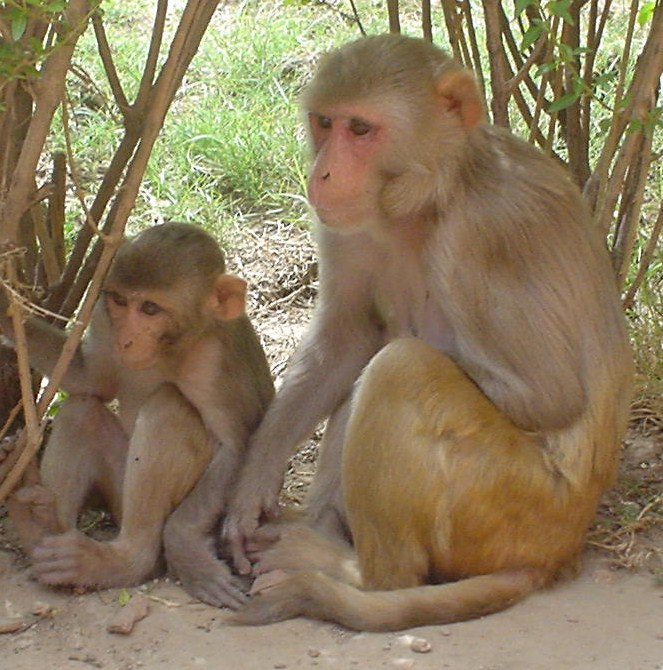
Rhesus macaques are able to be trained to use rudimentary tools, but have never been proven to use tools spontaneously in the wild.

Not only is it necessary for the body schema to be able to integrate and form a three-dimensional representation of the body, but it also plays an important role in tool use. Studies recording neuronal activity in the intraparietal cortex in macaques have shown that, with training, the macaque body schema updates to include tools, such as those used for reaching, into the body schema. In humans, body schema plays an important role in both simple and complex tool use, far beyond that of macaques. Extensive training is also not necessary for this integration.

The mechanisms by which tools are integrated into the body schema are not fully understood. However, studies with long-term training have shown interesting phenomena. When wielding tools in both hands in a crossed posture, behavioral effects reverse in a similar way to when only hands are crossed. Thus, sensory stimuli are delivered the same way be it to the hands directly or indirectly via the tools. These studies suggest the mind incorporates the tools into the same or similar areas as it does the adjacent hands. Recent research into the short term plasticity of the body schema used individuals without any prior training with tools. These results, derived from the relation between afterimages and body schema, show that tools are incorporated into the body schema within seconds, regardless of length of training, though the results do not extend to other species besides humans.

== Confusion with body image ==
Historically, body schema and body image were generally lumped together, used interchangeably, or ill-defined. In science and elsewhere, the two terms are still commonly misattributed or confused. Efforts have been made to distinguish the two and define them in clear and differentiable ways. A body image consists of perceptions, attitudes, and beliefs concerning one's body. In contrast, body schema consists of sensory-motor capacities that control movement and posture.

Body image may involve a person’s conscious perception of their own physical appearance. It is how individuals see themselves when picturing themselves in their mind, or when perceiving themselves in a mirror. Body image differs from body schema as perception differs from movement. Both may be involved in action, especially when learning new movements.

== See also ==
- Body image (medicine)
- Multisensory integration
- Body transfer illusion
- Peripheral neuropathy
- Schema (psychology)
- Attention schema theory
