= Jargon (disambiguation) =

Jargon is the arcane vocabulary of a specific activity, profession or other ingroup.

Jargon may also refer to:

- The Jargon Society, an independent press founded by the American poet Jonathan Williams
- "Jargon" is a deprecative reference to Yiddish, seen as a jargon of German

== See also ==
- Jargoon, a type of zircon
- Jargon aphasia, a fluent or receptive aphasia in which the patient's speech is incomprehensible, but appears to make sense to them
- Jargon File, a glossary of computer programmer slang
