= Arm swing in human locomotion =

Element of walking

Walk cycle with arm swing

Arm swing in human bipedal walking is a natural motion wherein each arm swings with the motion of the opposing leg. Swinging arms in an opposing direction with respect to the lower limb reduces the angular momentum of the body, balancing the rotational motion produced during walking. Although such pendulum-like motion of arms is not essential for walking, recent studies point that arm swing improves the stability and energy efficiency in human locomotion. Those positive effects of arm swing have been utilized in sports, especially in racewalking and sprinting.

== Kinematics ==
Studies on the role of arm swing consist mainly of analysis of bipedal walking models and treadmill experiments on human subjects. Bipedal walking models of various complexity levels provided an explanation for the effects of arm swing on human locomotion. On the course of bipedal walking, the leg swing results in an angular momentum that is balanced by the ground reaction moments on the stance foot. Swinging arms create an angular momentum in the opposing direction of lower limb rotation, reducing the total angular momentum of the body. Lower angular momentum of the body results in a decline on the ground reaction moment on the stance foot.

Amplitude or frequency of arm movements is determined by the gait, meaning that the swing motion is adaptive to changing conditions and perturbations. As the walking speed increases, the amplitude of the arm swing increases accordingly. The frequency of the arm movements changes with the speed as well. Studies showed that at speeds lower than approximately 0.8 m/s, the frequency ratio between arm and leg movements is 2:1 whereas above that speed the ratio becomes 1:1.

== Theories ==
=== Stability ===
Both simulations on skeletal models and experiments on force plate agree that the free arm swing limits the ground reaction moments effective on the stance foot during walking, because the total angular momentum is lowered by the counterbalancing swing of arms with respect to the lower-limb. In other words, a subject exerts less reaction moment to the ground surface when there is arm swing. This implies that the friction force between the stance foot and the ground surface does not have to be as high as without the arm swing.

=== Energy efficiency ===
Whether arm swing is a passive, natural motion caused by the rotation of torso or is an active motion that requires active muscle work has been a critical discussion on arm swing that could illuminate its benefit and function. A recent study concentrated on the energy consumption during walking showed that at low speeds arm swing is a passive motion dictated by the kinematics of torso, no different from a pair of pendula hung from the shoulders. Active upper extremity muscle work, controlled by the brain, only takes part when there is a perturbation and restores that natural motion. However, at higher speeds, the passive motion is insufficient to explain the amplitude of the swing observed in the experiments. The contribution of active muscle work increases with the walking speed. Despite the fact that a certain amount of energy is consumed for the arm movements, the total energy consumption drops meaning that arm swing still reduces the cost of walking. That reduction in energy is from 3-13%.

=== Evolution ===
The inter-limb coordination in human locomotion, questioning whether the human gait is based on quadruped locomotion, is another major topic of interest. Some research indicates that inter-limb coordination during human locomotion is organized in a similar way to that in the cat, promoting the view that the arm swing may be a residual function from quadruped gait. Another work on the control mechanisms of arm movements during walking corroborated the former findings, showing that central pattern generator (CPG) might be involved in cyclic arm swing. However, these findings do not imply vestigiality of arm swing, which appears to be debateful after the 2003 evidences on the function of arm swing in bipedal locomotion.

== Athletic performance ==
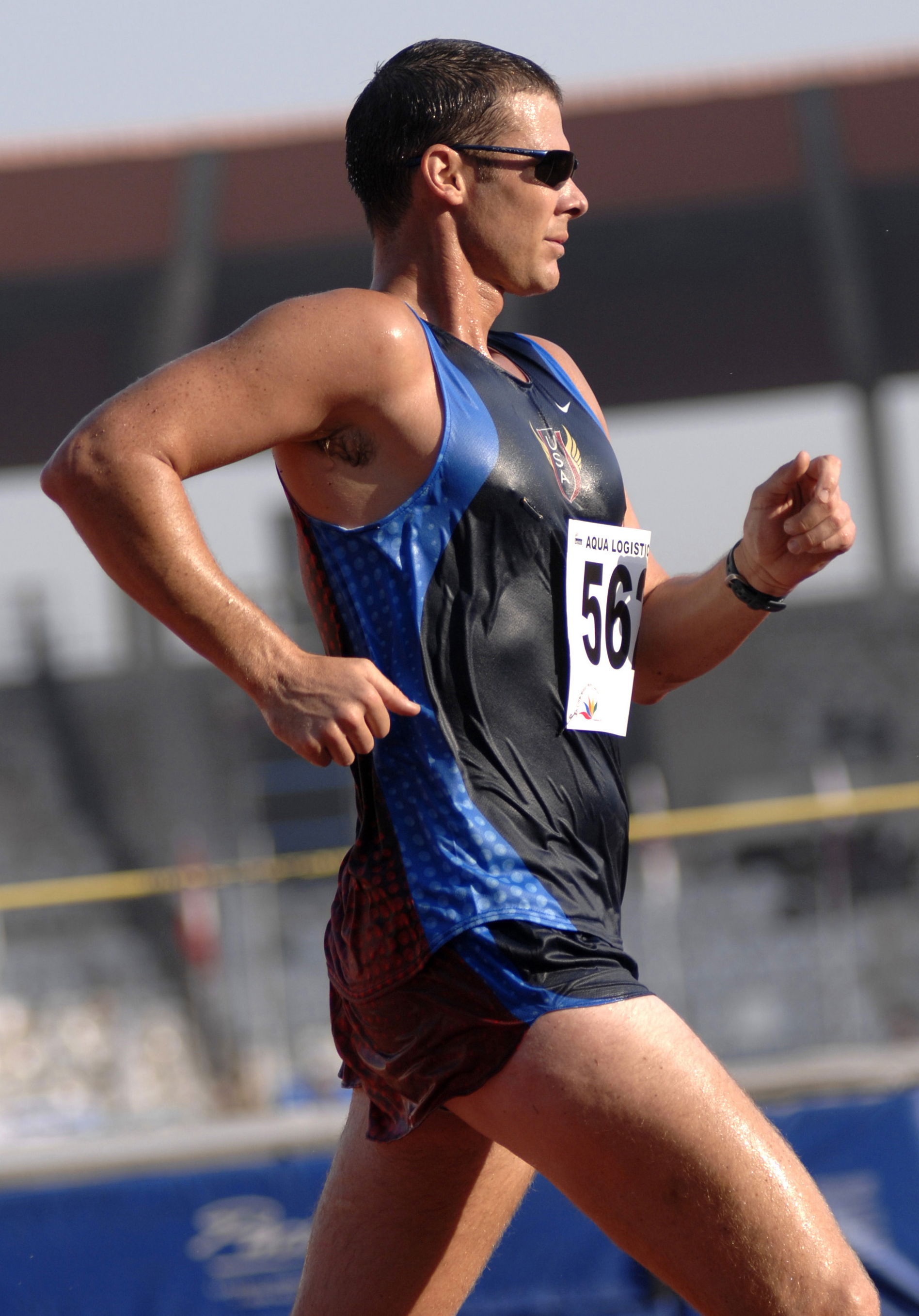
U.S. Army Sgt. John Nunn racewalks during the 2007 Military World Games competition in Hyderabad, India

Energy efficiency of arm swing and its potential in adjusting the momentum of the body have been utilized in sports. Sprinters make use of the contribution of arm swing on the linear momentum in order to get a higher forward acceleration. Racewalkers are also utilizing the arm swing for its energy efficiency. Rather than the rhythmic movements during walking, swinging arms in the right way helps athletic performance in different disciplines. Standing long jump performance is shown to be improved by swinging arms forward during the onset of the jump and back-and-forth during landing since the linear momentum of the body can be adjusted with the help of moving arms. Use of arms in adjusting the rotational and linear momentum is also a common practice in somersaulting and gymnastics.

== Robotics ==
The literature on the arm swing is partly created by robotics researchers as the stability in locomotion is a significant challenge especially in humanoid robots. So far although many humanoid robots preserve static equilibrium during walking which does not require arm swing, arm movements has been added to a recent humanoid robot walking in dynamic equilibrium. The pendulum-like motion of arms is also utilized in passive dynamic walkers, a mechanism that can walk on its own.

== Neuromechanical considerations ==
Understanding the underlying neural mechanisms on the organization of rhythmic arm movement and its coordination with the lower limb could enable development of effective strategies for rehabilitation of spinal cord injury and stroke patients. Rhythmic arm movements for different tasks -arm swing during walking, cycling arms while standing and arm swing while standing- were investigated in this perspective and the results pointed a common central control mechanism. Performing the left-lateralised Stroop task while walking on a treadmill tends to reduce arm swing on the right, particularly in older people, suggesting a significant supraspinal contribution to its maintenance. While men of all ages demonstrate this interference effect between cognitive load and right arm swing, women appear to be resistant until the age of 60.

== Medical science ==
The role of arm movements in unhealthy subjects is another popular direction investigating the strategies adopted by patients in order to maintain stability in walking. As an example, children with hemiparetic CP showed substantial increases in angular momentum generated by the legs, which were compensated by increased angular momentum of the unaffected arm showing the way arm swing is utilized in order to balance the rotational motion of the body. Reduction in bilateral arm coordination may contribute to clinically observed asymmetry in arm swing behavior which could be a sign of Parkinson's disease. A quantitative study on the level of asymmetry in arm swing is considered to have utility for early and differential diagnosis, and for tracking Parkinson's disease progression.

== See also ==
- Biomechanics of sprint running
- Bipedalism
- Central pattern generator
- Erb's palsy (unilateral reduced arm swing while walking)
- Gunslinger's gait (unilateral reduced arm swing while walking)
- Hemimotor neglect (may manifest as unilateral reduced arm swing while walking)
- Hemiparesis/Hemiplegia (unilateral reduced arm swing while walking)
- Interlimb coordination
- Parkinson's disease (may manifest as unilateral reduced arm swing while walking)
