= Anosognosia =

Unawareness of one's own illness, symptoms or impairments

- Pronunciation: /æˌnɒsɒɡˈnoʊziə/, /æˌnɒsɒɡˈnoʊʒə/
- Specialty: Psychiatry, Neurology

Anosognosia is a condition in which a person with a disability is cognitively unaware of having it due to an underlying physical condition. It is one of the several types of agnosia. Anosognosia results from physiological damage to brain structures, typically to the parietal lobe or a diffuse lesion on the fronto-temporal-parietal area in the right hemisphere, and is thus a neuropsychiatric disorder. A deficit of self-awareness, the term was coined by the neurologist Joseph Babinski in 1914, in order to describe the unawareness of hemiplegia.

Phenomenologically, anosognosia has similarities to denial, which is a psychological defense mechanism; attempts have been made at a unified explanation.

The name derives from Ancient Greek: ἀ-, a- ('without'), νόσος, nosos ('disease'), and γνῶσις, gnōsis ('knowledge'). It is considered a disorder that makes the treatment of the patient more difficult, since it may affect negatively the therapeutic relationship. Anosognosia is sometimes accompanied by asomatognosia, a form of neglect in which patients deny ownership of body parts such as their limbs.

== Causes ==
Relatively little has been discovered about the cause of the condition since its initial identification. Recent empirical studies tend to consider anosognosia a multi-componential syndrome or multi-faceted phenomenon. That is, it can be manifested by failure to be aware of a number of specific deficits, including motor (hemiplegia), sensory (hemianaesthesia, hemianopia), spatial (unilateral neglect), memory (dementia), and language (receptive aphasia) due to impairment of anatomo-functionally discrete monitoring systems.

Anosognosia is relatively common following different causes of brain injury, such as stroke and traumatic brain injury; for example, anosognosia for hemiparesis (weakness of one side of the body) with onset of acute stroke is estimated at between 10% and 18%. However, it can appear to occur in conjunction with virtually any neurological impairment. It is more frequent in the acute than in the chronic phase and more prominent for assessment in the cases with right hemispheric lesions than with the left.

The condition does not seem to be directly related to sensory loss but is thought to be caused by damage to higher level neurocognitive processes that are involved in integrating sensory information with processes that support spatial or bodily representations (including the somatosensory system). Anosognosia is thought to be related to unilateral neglect, a condition often found after damage to the non-dominant (usually the right) hemisphere of the cerebral cortex in which people seem unable to attend to, or sometimes comprehend, anything on a certain side of their body (usually the left).

Anosognosia can be selective in that an affected person with multiple impairments may seem unaware of only one handicap, while appearing to be fully aware of any others. This is consistent with the idea that the source of the problem relates to spatial representation of the body. For example, anosognosia for hemiplegia may occur with or without intact awareness of visuo-spatial unilateral neglect. This phenomenon of double dissociation can be an indicator of domain-specific disorders of awareness modules, meaning that in anosognosia, brain damage can selectively impact the self-monitoring process of one specific physical or cognitive function rather than a spatial location of the body.

There are also studies showing that the maneuver of vestibular stimulation could temporarily improve both the syndrome of spatial unilateral neglect and of anosognosia for left hemiplegia. Combining the findings of hemispheric asymmetry to the right, association with spatial unilateral neglect, and the temporal improvement on both syndromes, it is suggested there can be a spatial component underlying the mechanism of anosognosia for motor weakness and that neural processes could be modulated similarly. There were some cases of anosognosia for right hemiplegia after left hemisphere damage, but the frequency of this type of anosognosia has not been estimated.

Anosognosia may occur as part of receptive aphasia, a language disorder that causes poor comprehension of speech and the production of fluent but incomprehensible sentences. A patient with receptive aphasia cannot correct their own phonetics errors and shows "anger and disappointment with the person with whom s/he is speaking because that person fails to understand her/him". This may be a result of brain damage to the posterior portion of the superior temporal gyrus, believed to contain representations of word sounds. With those representations significantly distorted, patients with receptive aphasia are unable to monitor their mistakes. Other patients with receptive aphasia are fully aware of their condition and speech inhibitions, but cannot monitor their condition, which is not the same as anosognosia and therefore cannot explain the occurrence of neologistic jargon.

== Psychiatry ==
Although largely used to describe unawareness of impairment after brain injury or stroke, the term "anosognosia" is occasionally used to describe the lack of insight shown by some people with anorexia nervosa. They do not seem to recognize that they have a mental illness. There is evidence that anosognosia related to schizophrenia may be the result of frontal lobe damage.

== Diagnosis ==
Clinically, anosognosia is often assessed by giving patients an anosognosia questionnaire in order to assess their metacognitive knowledge of deficits. However, neither of the existing questionnaires applied in the clinics are designed thoroughly for evaluating the multidimensional nature of this clinical phenomenon; nor are the responses obtained via offline questionnaire capable of revealing the discrepancy of awareness observed from their online task performance. The discrepancy is noticed when patients showed no awareness of their deficits from the offline responses to the questionnaire but demonstrated reluctance or verbal circumlocution when asked to perform an online task. For example, patients with anosognosia for hemiplegia may find excuses not to perform a bimanual task even though they do not admit it is because of their paralyzed arms.

A similar situation can happen to patients with anosognosia for cognitive deficits after traumatic brain injury when monitoring their errors during the tasks regarding their memory and attention (online emergent awareness) and when predicting their performance right before the same tasks (online anticipatory awareness). It can also occur among patients with dementia and anosognosia for memory deficit when prompted with dementia-related words, showing possible pre-attentive processing and implicit knowledge of their memory problems. Patients with anosognosia may also overestimate their performance when asked in first-person formed questions but not from a third-person perspective when the questions referring to others.

When assessing the causes of anosognosia within stroke patients, CT scans have been used to assess where the greatest amount of damage is found within the various areas of the brain. Stroke patients with mild and severe levels of anosognosia (determined by response to an anosognosia questionnaire) have been linked to lesions within the temporoparietal and thalamic regions, when compared to those who experience moderate anosognosia, or none at all. In contrast, after a stroke, people with moderate anosognosia have a higher frequency of lesions involving the basal ganglia, compared to those with mild or severe anosognosia.

== Treatment ==
In regard to anosognosia for neurological patients, no long-term treatments exist. As with unilateral neglect, caloric reflex testing (squirting ice cold water into the left ear) is known to temporarily ameliorate unawareness of impairment. It is not entirely clear how this works, although it is thought that the unconscious shift of attention or focus caused by the intense stimulation of the vestibular system temporarily influences awareness. Most cases of anosognosia appear to simply disappear over time, while other cases can last indefinitely. Normally, long-term cases are treated with cognitive therapy to train patients to adjust for their inoperable limbs (though it is believed that these patients still are not "aware" of their disability). Another commonly used method is the use of feedback—comparing clients' self-predicted performance with their actual performance on a task in an attempt to improve insight.

Neurorehabilitation is difficult because, as anosognosia impairs the patient's desire to seek medical aid, it may also impair their ability to seek rehabilitation. A lack of awareness of the deficit makes cooperative, mindful work with a therapist difficult. In the acute phase, very little can be done to improve their awareness, but during this time, it is important for the therapist to build a therapeutic alliance with patients by entering their phenomenological field and reducing their frustration and confusion. Since severity changes over time, no single method of treatment or rehabilitation has emerged or will likely emerge.

== See also ==
- Anosodiaphoria
- Anton–Babinski syndrome
- Body schema
- Body transfer illusion
- Confabulation
- Cotard delusion
- Unilateral neglect (also known as hemispatial neglect)
