= Gunslinger's gait =

Walking pattern of KGB or Red Army members

The gunslinger's gait or KGB walk is a walking pattern observed in individuals associated with the KGB or the Red Army.

== Walking pattern ==
It is a standard walk, except with the non-dominant hand swinging freely, but the other in place, near a pocket or a holster, so that the individual is ready to draw a gun at a moment's notice if there were to be an unexpected threat. This type of walk is taught in the manuals for KGB officers and it is where it is believed to have originated, but it is a recurring behavior in the Red Army and other military, security, and espionage organizations. The term "gunslinger's gait" was coined by a group of British researchers in 2015, who published a study analysing this unusual walking pattern in Vladimir Putin and other several high-ranked Russian government officials; Dimitry Medvedev, Anatoly Serdyukov, Sergei Ivanov, and Anatoly Sidorov. Serdyukov, Ivanov, and Sidorov all have had prior KGB or Red Army training, but Medvedev is an exception.

== Vladimir Putin ==
The gunslinger's gait is notable in Russian president Vladimir Putin, an ex-KGB member. He has been seen walking in this style, as early as April 2000, while he was Acting President of Russia and prior to him becoming President of Russia. There has been speculation that it may be a sign of Parkinson's disease, however a more plausible explanation is that it is due to his KGB training, that he has had such a gait for decades, as well as other Russian officials that exhibited a similar style of walk.

== See also ==
- Arm swing in human locomotion
