= Gerstmann =

Gerstmann is a surname. Notable people with the surname include:

- Jeff Gerstmann (born 1975), American video game journalist and musician
- Josef Gerstmann (1887–1969), Austrian neurologist
- Louis Gerstman (1930–1992), American neuropsychologist
- Blanche Gerstman (1910–1973), South African composer

== See also ==
- Gerstmann syndrome, a neuropsychological disorder
- Gerstmann–Sträussler–Scheinker syndrome, a very rare fatal neurodegenerative disease
