= Pseudoneglect =

Natural tendency of shifting spatial attention to the left

The term pseudoneglect refers to the natural tendency of shifting spatial attention to the left. The concept was introduced and evidenced by experimental findings regarding the line bisection task. In this task, participants are supposed to mark the middle of a horizontal line. On average, their deviations from the actual center of the line tend to be more to the left than to the right. In other visuo-spatial tasks, a similar bias to the left hemifield is apparent. Pseudoneglect shows similarities to impairments in patients with a medial condition called hemispatial neglect. However, the effects of pseudoneglect are marginal and mainly restricted to experimental settings in scientific labs.

In 2020, archaeologists of the Collaborative Research Center CRC 1266 at Kiel University succeeded in proving this behavior in prehistory. In the Linear Pottery, so-called long houses were built. In the Neolithic settlement of Vráble, in the southwest of Slovakia, three comparatively large settlement agglomerations with hundreds of such longhouses are located in direct proximity to each other. If a new house is built next to an old one, it was oriented to the existing house. The settlements in Vráble existed for about 300 years as determined by the 14C data. During this period, a progressive counterclockwise rotation of the orientation of the houses from about 32° to 4° was observed. An examination of published and dated village plans from other Linear Pottery regions confirms that this counterclockwise rotation is a general Central European trend. This shows that whenever the houses were to be oriented in a certain direction and parallel to each other, there was a perceptual error that caused a slight counterclockwise rotation. The researchers explain this as an unconscious but systematic leftward bias, as it defines the term pseudoneglect.

Pseudoneglect has been reported for left-handed as well as right-handed people. The bias to the left side is more pronounced in right-handers.
