= Anosodiaphoria =

- Specialty: Neurology

Anosodiaphoria is the inability to recognize the full importance of a neurological disability brought on by a brain lesion. It might be specifically associated with defective functioning of the frontal lobe of the right hemisphere.

Joseph Babinski first used the term anosodiaphoria in 1914 to describe a disorder of the body schema in which patients verbally acknowledge a clinical problem (such as hemiparesis) but fail to be concerned about it. Anosodiaphoria follows a stage of anosognosia, in which there may be verbal, explicit denial of the illness, and after several days to weeks, develop the lack of emotional response.

== Causes ==
A few possible explanations for anosodiaphoria exist:

1. The patient is aware of the deficit but does not fully comprehend it or its significance for functioning
2. May be related to an affective communication disorder and defective arousal. These emotional disorders cannot account for the verbal explicit denial of illness of anosognosia.

Other explanations include reduced emotional experience, impaired emotional communication, alexithymia, behavioral abnormalities, dysexecutive syndrome, and the frontal lobes.

== Neurology ==
Anosodiaphoria occurs after stroke of the brain. 27% of patients with an acute hemispheric stroke had the stroke in the right hemisphere, while 2% have it in their left.

The frontal lobe is thought to be the primary area for the lack of emotional insight seen in anosodiaphoria, such as in frontotemporal dementia. A 2011 study done by Mendez and Shapira found that people with frontotemporal dementia also had a loss of insight more properly described as "frontal anosodiaphoria", a lack of concern for proper self-appraisal. Patients were found to have a lack of emotional updating, or concern for having an illness; an absence of an emotional self-referent tagging of information on their disorder, which they think is possibly from disease in the ventromedial prefrontal cortex, anterior cingulate-anterior insula area, especially on the right.

== Treatment ==
Indifference to illness may have an adverse impact on a patient's engagement in neurological rehabilitation, cognitive rehabilitation and physical rehabilitation. Patients are not likely to implement rehabilitation for a condition about which they are indifferent. Although anosognosia often resolves in days to weeks after stroke, anosodiaphoria often persists.

== See also ==
- Anosognosia
- Body schema
- Brain damage
- Frontotemporal dementia
- Indifference
- Oliver Sacks
- Unilateral neglect
