= The Divine Farce =

2009 novella by Michael Graziano

- Author: Michael Graziano
- Genre: Horror, surreal
- Publisher: Leapfrog Press
- Publication date: 2009
- Pages: 125
- ISBN: 978-1-935248-04-0

The Divine Farce is a 2009 horror novella by Michael Graziano about a man navigating an ambiguous afterlife. The narrator, referred to only by Sage, shares a cramped cell with a man and a woman named Rose and Henry. As their world continues to expand, so does Sage's perspective on their shared universe.

== Synopsis ==
Sage, the male narrator, is trapped in an enclosure with two others whom he names Rose and Henry. They live off of a nectar that secretes through the ceiling. One day, after a long time of scraping at the wall, Sage is able to break the three of them out and into a new world. The new cave-like place is filled with humans, and Sage is unfortunately separated from his friends in the crowd. Sage carries on living, fighting others for the limited biscuits or clean water and looking for Rose and Henry. After noticing a bat fly out through a hole in the ceiling, Sage decides to build a rope out of human hair in order to escape as well. After he finishes his long rope, he climbs out through the ceiling and finds an empty world with no competition for food or drink, but no other humans either. He never gives up his mission to find Rose and Henry.

== Reception ==
Writing for The Barnstable Patriot, Michael Lee praises The Divine Farce, citing Graziano's ability to move the story along despite its short length. Lee also compliments the main character Sage's undying optimism, saying "what is so remarkable about this slim novel is the scope of optimism that separates us from the other living creatures of the planet."
