= Vráble =

- Municipality
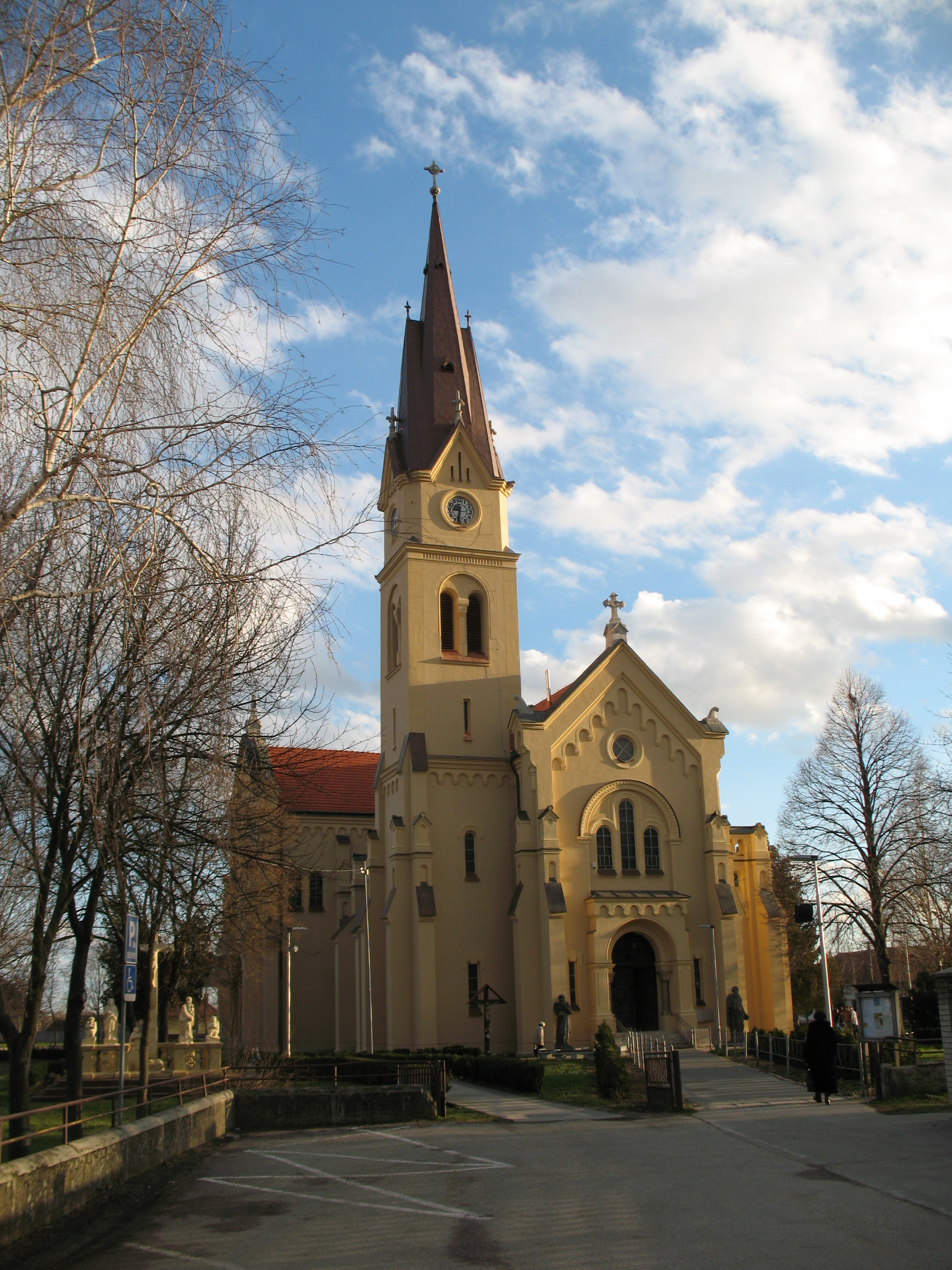
- Church of the Virgin Mary

- Flag Coat of arms

- Location of Vráble in the Nitra Region Location of Vráble in Slovakia
- Coordinates: 48°14′27″N 18°18′31″E
- Country: Slovakia
- Region: Nitra Region
- District: Nitra District
- First mentioned: 1265

Government
  - Mayor: Viktor Németh

Area
  - Total: 38.31 km^{2} (14.79 sq mi)
- Elevation: 144 m (472 ft)

Population (2025)
  - Total: 8,170
- Time zone: UTC+1 (CET)
  - Summer (DST): UTC+2 (CEST)
- Postal code: 952 01
- Area code: +421 37
- Vehicle registration plate (until 2022): NR
- Website: www.vrable.sk

Vráble is a small town in the Nitra District, Nitra Region, western Slovakia.

== Etymology ==
The name derives from vrábeľ - a Slovak dialect name of sparrow (vrabec).

== Geography ==
The municipality lies at an altitude of 144 metres (472 ft) and covers an area of 38.31 km^{2} (14.79 sq mi) (2025).

It is located in the Danubian Hills on the Žitava river, about 15 kilometres (9.3 miles) south-east-east from Nitra. The cadastral area of the town has an altitude from 140 to 240 metres (460 to 790 feet) ASL. There's a small dam called Vodná nádrž Vráble west of the town.

The town has three parts: Vráble proper, and the former villages of Dyčka and Horný Ohaj (both annexed 1975).

== History ==
The oldest evidence of the settlement of Vráble comes from the Neolithic age (6000–2000 BC), where a major settlement was located here. The first written reference is from 1265 as Verebel. In Vráble, there was the oldest post-station. The city kept an agricultural character in the 19th and 20th centuries. Economic development has influenced the architecture of the city. Before the establishment of independent Czechoslovakia in 1918, Vráble was part of Bars County within the Kingdom of Hungary. From 1939 to 1945, it was again part of Hungary as a result of the First Vienna Award.

== Population ==
Population statistic (10 years)
Year	1995	2005	2015	2025
Count	9649	9486	8768	8170
Difference		−1.68%	−7.56%	−6.82%

Population statistic
Year	2024	2025
Count	8262	8170
Difference		−1.11%

It has a population of 8170 people (31 December 2025).

=== Ethnicity ===
Census 2021 (1+%)
Ethnicity	Number	Fraction
Slovak	7761	90.31%
Not found out	638	7.42%
Hungarian	285	3.31%
Total	8593	

In year 2021 was 8593 people by ethnicity 7761 as Slovak, 638 as Not found out, 285 as Hungarian, 53 as Czech, 19 as Russian, 18 as Other, 15 as Romani, 8 as Ukrainian, 6 as Rusyn, 5 as Polish, 4 as Jewish, 4 as Chinese, 4 as Romanian, 3 as Serbian, 3 as German, 2 as Canadian, 2 as Croatian, 2 as Albanian, 1 as Italian, 1 as Austrian, 1 as French and 1 as Bulgarian.

Note on population: The difference values of population numbers in the table "Population statistic" and in the sections "Ethnicity" & "Religion" is caused by the use of various statistical methods.

=== Religion ===
Census 2021 (1+%)
Religion	Number	Fraction
Roman Catholic Church	6060	70.52%
None	1594	18.55%
Not found out	629	7.32%
Total	8593	

In year 2021 was 8593 people by religion 6060 from Roman Catholic Church, 1594 from None, 629 from Not found out, 82 from Evangelical Church, 43 from Ad hoc movements, 33 from Greek Catholic Church, 28 from Christian Congregations in Slovakia, 28 from Other, 18 from Other and not ascertained christian church, 16 from Calvinist Church, 16 from Jehovah's Witnesses, 11 from Eastern Orthodox Church, 11 from Apostolic Church, 8 from Seventh-day Adventist Church, 6 from Paganism and natural spirituality, 5 from Buddhism, 2 from Old Catholic Church, 2 from Baptists Church and 1 from Church of Jesus Christ of Latter-day Saints.

The town had Hungarian majority in the 17th century according to the Turkish tax census.

According to the 2001 census, the town had 9,493 inhabitants. 93.32% of inhabitants were Slovaks, 4.69% Hungarians, 0.78% Roma and 0.55% Czechs. The religious make-up was 88.41% Roman Catholics, 8.53% people with no religious affiliation and 0.62% Lutherans.

== Fidvár archaeological site ==
One of the largest urban agglomerations of the Bronze Age in Europe was found at Fidvár near Vráble. The area of 20 hectares makes it larger than the contemporary Mycenae and Troy. The settlement was inhabited by about 1,000 people and buildings were built around streets. Three ditches strengthened the fortifications. The site is also the northernmost known tell in Central Europe dating from the Early Bronze Age. It was an important centre for the exploitation of nearby gold and tin deposits. The settlement is attributed to the Únětice culture and Mad'arovce culture.

== Twin towns — sister cities ==
Vráble is twinned with:

- Andouillé, France
- Csurgó, Hungary
- Nova Varoš, Serbia
