= Prism adaptation =

Adaptation to a shifted visual field

Prism adaptation is a sensory-motor adaptation that occurs after the visual field has been artificially shifted laterally or vertically. It was first introduced by Hermann von Helmholtz in late 19th-century Germany as supportive evidence for his perceptual learning theory. Since its discovery, prism adaptation has been suggested to improve spatial deficits in patients with unilateral neglect.

== Prism adaptation paradigm ==
During prism adaptation, an individual wears special prismatic goggles that are made of prism wedges that displace the visual field laterally or vertically. In most cases the visual field is shifted laterally either in the rightward or leftward direction. While wearing the goggles, the individual engages in a perceptual motor task such as pointing to a visual target directly in front of them. A prism adaptation session includes three components: the pre-test, prism exposure, and the post-test. The effects of the prism adaptation paradigm are observed when the performance on the perceptual motor task of the pre-and post-test are compared.

1. Pre-test: For example, the pre-test measures the observer's ability to point to the visual target directly in front of them before prism exposure. This task can be completed with ease and accuracy by normal, healthy individuals.
2. Prism Exposure: During prism exposure, the initial attempts at pointing to the target are off- target because the observer's visual field has been laterally shifted in one direction. The initial pointing errors during prism exposure occur in the same direction of the visual shift. For example, if the prismatic goggles displace the visual field to the right, the initial pointing errors would occur to the right of the visual target until a sensory-motor adaptation known as the ‘direct effect of prism adaptation’ occurs.

The initial pointing errors induced by the prismatic goggles are caused by the misalignment of the observer's motor and proprioceptive maps. Once the error has been detected, the observer makes a conscious effort to try and fix the error via strategic recalibration. The reduction in error is also helped by an unconscious process referred to as spatial realignment, which gradually realigns the visual and proprioceptive maps. This means that over a series of repeated attempts, the observer is able to reduce the margin of error and become more accurate in pointing to the visual target despite the visual displacement. Usually it takes an individual as few as 10 trials to adapt to the visual displacement and successfully point to the target.

3) Post-test: During the post test the prismatic goggles are removed. The direct effect adaptation observed as a result of prism exposure persists and results in what is known as the prism adaptation negative after-effect. The negative after-effect causes the initial attempts in pointing to the visual target during the post-test to be in the direction opposite that of the visual shift. For example, if the observer was exposed to rightward shifting prisms, then the initial pointing errors induced by the after-effect would be to the left of the target. The extent of the observed after-effects reflects the amount of realignment that has taken place in visual and proprioceptive spatial maps during prism exposure. The negative after-effect is not permanent but varies in its duration depending on the number of sessions and time the patient is exposed to prism adaptation sessions. Eventually the after-effect wears off and pointing abilities return to pre-test levels.

== Neural mechanisms underlying prism adaptation ==
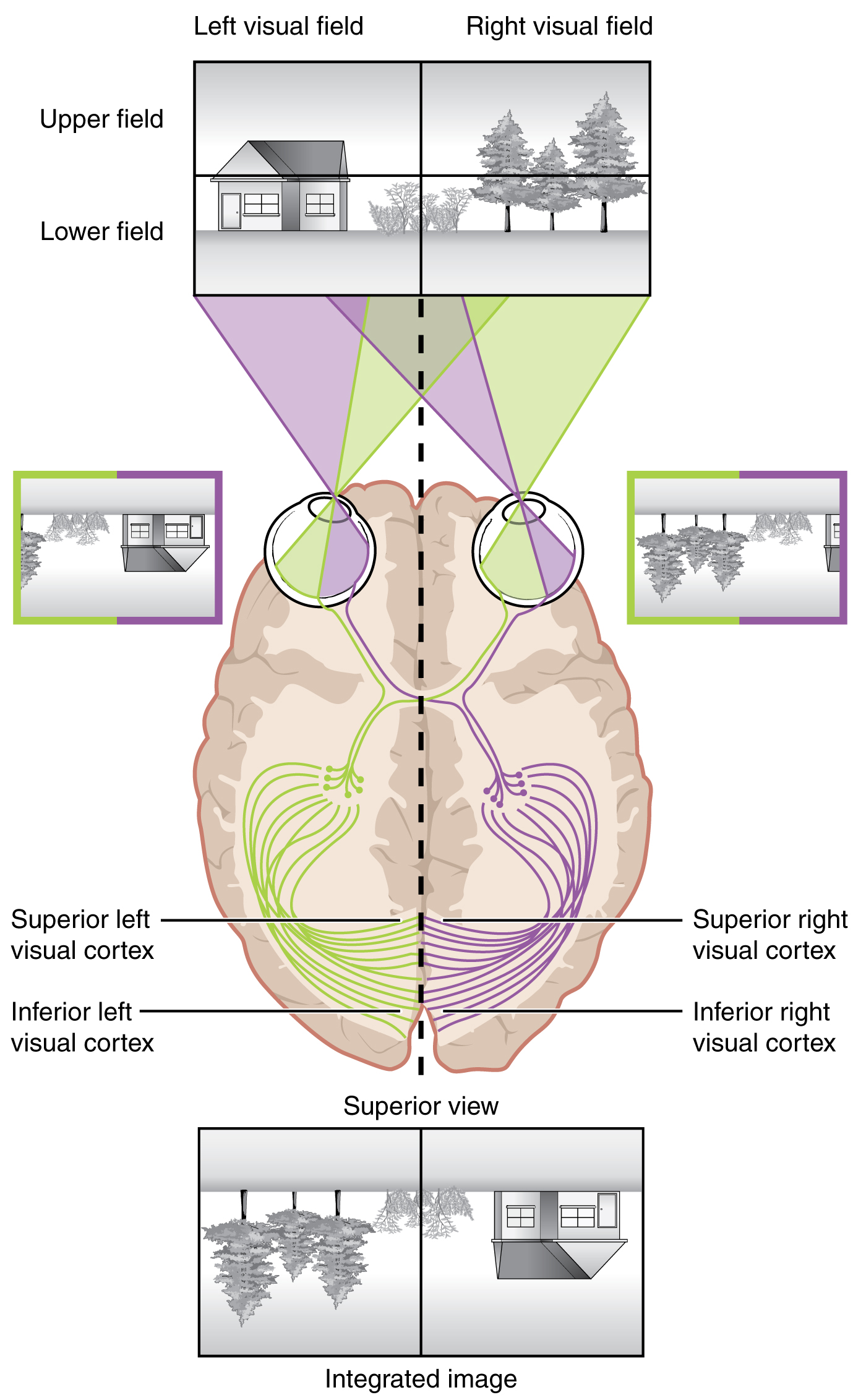
Topographic mapping of the retina onto the visual cortex.

Different regions of the brain are activated throughout the duration of prism exposure and have proven to contribute to the error reductions in pointing to a visual target. An fMRI study done in 2009 by Laute et al. examined the neural activation patterns associated with the error correction phase of prism adaptation and found that the left anterior intraparietal sulcus was activated proportional to pointing deviation, and its activation gradually decreased with adaptation, while an increase in activation of the parieto-occipital sulcus was observed as movement plans were adjusted on a trial-by-trial basis. It was suggested that the intraparietal sulcus is involved in error detection whereas the parieto-occipital sulcus is involved in error correction. Another fMRI study done in 2010 by Chapman et al. found that the neural mechanisms underlying the later, spatial realignment phase of prism adaptation recruited the right cerebellum and inferior parietal lobule. The above mechanisms related to primarily spatial perceptual or representational systems. However, it has also been argued that prism adaptation therapy does not affect sensory or perceptual representational systems, rather primarily affects spatial Aiming systems. These systems, when damaged, are responsible for pathological directional hypokinesia in spatial neglect, and thus a beneficial effect of PAT on Aiming spatial neglect would be primarily mediated via changes in motor bearing: frontal cortical networks including subcortical and dorsal parietal cortical regions.

== Prism adaptation therapy ==
Prism adaptation can be used to rehabilitate the visuo-spatial deficits of neurological disorders such as unilateral neglect. It has become clear that with respect to being used as a long-term rehabilitative tool, prism adaptation is only effective when it is repeated over many sessions and with sufficiently strong prism goggles. Typically, unilateral neglect patients unconsciously ignore the left spatial hemifield due to right parietal or right hemisphere brain damage attributed to stroke, traumatic brain injury or other disorders. These patients are unaware that they exhibit deficits of perception, attention, mental imagery, and movements within the neglected hemifield. Since these patients are unaware of their attentional deficits, they cannot voluntarily orient their attention toward the neglected side of space unlike patients with hemianopsia. Unilateral neglect therefore induces various functionally debilitating effects on everyday life.

Prism adaptation has been introduced as a form of rehabilitation therapy for patients with unilateral neglect. The main issue faced by unilateral neglect patients is that their frame of visual attention is not only pathologically smaller but also biased towards the right visual hemifield. This in turn results in the complete negligence of the left visual hemifield. With the use of prism adaptation, their visual-attention frame is realigned so that some of the neglected left visual field comes into attentional focus. The use of right-deviating prisms shifts the patient's entire visual field to the right and realigns the left visual field into attentional focus. This spatial realignment has proven to persist long after prism exposure and ameliorate unilateral neglect symptoms by allowing the patient to be aware of the previously neglected side of space. A proposed mechanism behind such improvements involves increased ocular movements towards the neglected side after prism adaptation. Prism exposure promotes the resetting of the ocular-motor system in the brain and results in improved higher order visual spatial representations that allow for the sustained improvement of unilateral neglect symptoms.

== Prism adaptation and improvements of unilateral neglect symptoms ==
The positive effects of prism adaptation on symptoms of neglect have been shown to vary in the amount of time they persist and in their generalization to other sensory modality tasks besides visual-motor tasks. The short term (2-hour) amelioration of unilateral neglect introduced by Rossetti et al., 1998 sparked an interest in converting this short-term effect into a long-term rehabilitative effect. The following is the progression of scientific studies conducted to investigate prism adaptation's potential rehabilitative effects:

Rossi et al., 1990, was the first article to report an attempt the use of prisms as a potential tool for both hemianopia and of Unilateral neglect. Rossetti et al. then published a controlled study of stroke survivors with neglect which reported performance improvement of neglect deficits was in all patients immediately after and 2 hours after prism exposure. These results were obtained via comparison of the patients’ performance on a series of neuropsychological test before and after the prism adaptation session. The neuropsychological tests used included line bisection, line cancellation, copying a simple drawing made of five items, drawing of a daisy from memory, and reading a simple text.

Prism adaptation was also shown to improve representational neglect in a case study in by Rode et al., 2001. Two unilateral neglect patients demonstrated spatial cognitive improvements when asked to mentally image the map of France in their minds and name all of the towns they could “see” within a time frame of two minutes. After prism adaptation these patients named an increased number of towns, specifically naming towns that were located on the left side of the map. The results indicate that prism adaptation can also induce higher cognitive changes in spatial representation.

Significant reductions in unilateral neglect symptoms were seen in 2002. Improvements in visual-motor, visual-verbal, behavioral, and spatial cognitive tasks were observed to last up to 5 weeks after a twice-daily, two-week prism adaptation program. The standard tests included visual motor tasks such as line cancellation, line bisection and drawing by copying or memory. The visual-verbal tasks included object description, object naming and word reading. The behavioral tests included picture scanning, telephone dialing, menu and article reading, address and sentence copying, telling and setting the time, coin and card sorting and map navigation tests. The spatial cognition tests included the room description test and an object reaching test.

In a 1-month follow-up study, a placebo treatment (pointing with non-deviating goggles) was included to compare with the prism adaptation treatment. It was found that only prism adaptation yields significant long-term reduction of neglect symptoms that lasted at least one month after the prism adaptation session.

Improvements of neglect symptoms have been shown to last up to six months. and in a more recent study improvements were recorded to last 2-3.5 years after prism adaptation.

== Problems with the application and translation of prism adaptation in clinical treatment of spatial neglect ==
Barrett et al. conducted a review of 48 articles using prism adaptation for spatial neglect and called for critical work to be performed in order to bring this treatment to a stage where useful information can be generated in a clinical trial. Noting that previous experiments. report that spatial Aiming deficits selectively respond to prism adaptation treatment and that the presence of Aiming deficits predicts good response to prism adaptation therapy, and also that the classical visual-attentional spatial "where" deficits may not improve with therapy, the authors questioned the validity of including consecutive, unselected patients with neglect in any randomized treatment-control study. This is because more stroke survivors with one type of deficit may end up in either the treatment, or the control group, altering the expected treatment effect size. The fundamental issue of an effective treatment dosage range is only beginning to be examined—either number of treatments, duration, or degree of prismatic shift—which would be unthinkable in drug development for stroke deficits. Lastly, functional impact of prism adaptation treatment (improvements in real-life activities and participation) is woefully under-examined.
