= Hemimotor neglect =

Neuropsychological condition

Hemimotor neglect or simply motor neglect is a neuropsychological condition that occurs after damage to one hemisphere of the brain, characterized by a failure of spontaneous use of upper and lower limbs on one side of body. It occurs in the absence of paralysis, pyramidal syndromes, extrapyramidal symptoms, strength and primary sensory deficit.

== Presentation ==
Motor neglect can occur in isolation from, or in association with hemispatial neglect, making the pathological state more complicated in at least 30% of patients with brain damage. Motor neglect has been described in different terms: disorders and intentional neglect; motor hemi neglect; thalamic, nonsensory neglect; and callosal neglect.

Laplane and Degos coined the term motor neglect, giving this definition:"Absent or low use of spontaneous contralesional limb (lower and/or higher), despite preserved motor skills...not explained by weakness or lack of sensitivity, it improves with the verbal suggestion".

=== Clinical features ===
Motor neglect concerns all proximal and distal movements, involving both the upper and lower limb in automatic gestures. Taxonomy of motor neglect symptoms is diverse: poor use of the affected limb, difficulty in bimanual activities (such as opening a bottle), spontaneous gestures reduced especially while speaking and, lack of "swing" of the arm while walking. The gait is unbalanced, and the lower limb is often dragged with the consequent risk of falls. Movements of the neglected limb, when executed, are initiated with delay hypokinesia, reduced in their amplitude, and accompanied by bradykinesia One of the most distinctive features of motor neglect is the verbal prompt. Specifically, patients that are encouraged to use the limb with motor neglect have relatively normal movement, but do not perform the same movement spontaneously.

Two forms of motor deficits are associated with, but different from, motor neglect: directional hypokinesia and, motor neglect component Directional hypokinesia refers to a deficit of startup of movements of ipsilesional limbs in contralesional space. Patients are slowed down when they have to perform an action with the non-neglected limb in space account side, despite preservation of control and motor coordination. Motor neglect component is similar to motor neglect but, unlike the latter, doesn't improve through direct verbal command, only through vestibular caloric stimulation.

== See also ==
- Hemispatial neglect
- Arm swing in human locomotion
- Brain damage
- Neuropsychology
