= Michael Graziano =

American scientist and novelist

- Born: May 22, 1967 (age 59); Bridgeport, Connecticut
- Other name: B. B. Wurge
- Education: Princeton University
- Occupations: Author, scientist

Michael Steven Anthony Graziano (born May 22, 1967) is an American scientist and novelist who is currently a professor of psychology and neuroscience at Princeton University. His scientific research focuses on the brain basis of awareness. He has proposed the "attention schema" theory, an explanation of how, and for what adaptive advantage, brains attribute the property of awareness to themselves. His previous work focused on how the cerebral cortex monitors the space around the body and controls movement within that space. Notably he has suggested that the classical map of the body in motor cortex, the homunculus, is not correct and is better described as a map of complex actions that make up the behavioral repertoire. His publications on this topic have had a widespread impact among neuroscientists but have also generated controversy. His novels rely partly on his background in psychology and are known for surrealism or magic realism. Graziano also composes music including symphonies and string quartets.

== Biography ==
Graziano was born in Bridgeport, Connecticut, in 1967 and spent his childhood in Buffalo, New York. He received his Bachelor of Arts (BA) degree from Princeton University in 1989 in psychology. He attended graduate school in neuroscience at MIT from 1989 to 1991 and then returned to Princeton University to complete his doctoral degree in 1996, in neuroscience and psychology. He remained at Princeton University as a postdoctoral researcher and then as a professor of neuroscience and psychology.

== Contributions in neuroscience ==
Graziano has made contributions in three areas of neuroscience: how neurons in the primate brain encode peripersonal space, how the motor cortex controls complex movement, and the possible neuronal basis of consciousness. These contributions are detailed in the following sections.

=== Peripersonal space ===
In the 1990s, Graziano with Charles Gross described the properties of a set of multisensory neurons in the monkey brain. Building on the work of Hyvarinen and colleagues and Rizzolatti and colleagues Graziano and Gross described a network of brain areas that appeared to encode the space immediately surrounding the body.

Multimodal neurons in the monkey brain that encode the space near the body. Each neuron responds to touching a specific part of the body called the neuron's tactile receptive field. The same neuron responds to visual stimuli in the space near the tactile receptive field. Two examples are depicted. From Graziano MSA and Gross CG (1998) Spatial maps for the control of movement. Current Opinion in Neurobiology, 8: 195 -201.

Each multisensory neuron responded to a touch within a specific "tactile receptive field" on the body surface. Each neuron also responded to a visual stimulus near or approaching the tactile receptive field. The "visual receptive field" was therefore a region of nearby space affixed to the relevant body part. Some neurons responded to sound sources near the tactile receptive field. Some neurons also responded mnemonically, becoming active when a part of the body moved through space and approached the remembered location of an object in the dark. The activity of these multisensory neurons therefore signaled the presence of an object near or touching a part of the body, regardless of whether the object was felt, seen, heard, or remembered.

Electrical stimulation of these multisensory neurons almost always evoked a complex, coordinated movement that resembled a flinching, blocking, or protecting action. Chemical inhibition of these neurons produced a "nerves of steel" state in which defensive reactions were inhibited. Chemical enhancement of these neurons produced a "super flincher" state in which any mild stimulus, such as an object gently moved toward the face, evoked a full-blown flinching reaction.

In Graziano's interpretation, these multisensory neurons form a specialized brain-wide network that encodes the space near the body, computes a margin of safety, and helps to coordinate movements in relation to nearby objects with an emphasis on withdrawal or blocking movements. A subtle level of activation might bias ongoing behavior to avoid collision, whereas a strong level of activation evidently causes an overt defensive action.

The neurons that encode peripersonal space may also provide a neuronal basis for the psychological phenomenon of personal space. Personal space, described by Hall, is the flexible bubble of space around each person that is protected from intrusion by other people.

The peripersonal neurons may also play a central role in the body schema an internally computed model of the body first proposed to exist by Head and Holmes in 1911.

=== An action map in the motor cortex ===
In the 2000s Graziano's lab obtained evidence suggesting that the motor cortex might not contain a simple map of the body's muscles as in classical descriptions such as Penfield's description of a motor homunculus. Instead, the motor cortex may contain a mapping of coordinated, behaviorally useful actions that make up a typical movement repertoire.

In their initial experiments, Graziano and colleagues used electrical microstimulation on the motor cortex of monkeys. Most previous protocols in the motor cortex used very brief stimulation, such as for a hundredth of a second. Graziano applied the stimulation for half a second each time, on a behaviorally relevant time scale, in order to match the typical duration of a monkey's reaching and grasping. The longer stimulation train in Graziano's experiments evoked complex movements that included many joints and that resembled movements from the animal's behavioral repertoire.

For example, stimulation of one site always caused the hand to close in a grip, the arm to bring the hand to the mouth, and the mouth to open. Stimulation of another site always caused the grip to open, the palm to face away from the body, and the arm to extend, as if the monkey were reaching to grasp an object. Other sites evoked other complex movements. The behavioral repertoire of the animal seemed to be rendered onto the cortical sheet.

This initial work became controversial because of the method of stimulation on a behavioral time scale. The method was not commonly used in the study of motor cortex although it had been used in the study of other brain regions. That controversy may have partially distracted from the other methods used to study the action map. For example, computational models show that when the complex movement repertoire of a monkey is arranged in a flattened map, with similar movements represented near each other, the map closely resembles the known arrangement of the monkey motor cortex.

In Graziano's proposal, many of the complexities of the motor cortex, such as its overlapping maps of the body and its multiple areas with somewhat different mixtures of properties, may be a result of representing the many parts of the movement repertoire each with its own specialized computational requirements. Graziano suggests that the action-map view does not contradict the more traditional view of motor cortex as a set of fields with differing functions. Instead, the action map may help to explain why motor cortex is divided into functionally distinct fields and why the fields are arranged spatially as they are.

Other researchers have since found a similar, ethological organization to motor cortical regions in monkeys, prosimians, cats, and rats. Notwithstanding, direct tests of the idea that the motor cortex contains a movement repertoire have not corroborated this hypothesis. Varying the initial position of the forelimb does not change the muscle synergies evoked by microstimulation of a motor cortical point. Consequently, the evoked movements reach nearly the same final end point and posture, with variability. However, the movement trajectories are quite different depending on the initial limb posture and the starting position of the paw. The evoked movement trajectory is most natural when the forelimb lays pendant ~ perpendicular to the ground (i.e., in equilibrium with the gravitational force). From other starting positions, the movements do not appear natural. The paths of the paw are curved with changes and reversals of direction and the passive influence of the gravitational force on the movements is obvious. These observations demonstrate that while the output of the cortical point evokes a seemingly coordinated limb movement from a rest position, it does not specify a particular movement direction or a controlled trajectory from other initial positions. Thus, in natural conditions a controlled movement must depend on the coordinated activation of a multitude of cortical points, terminating at a final locus of motor cortical activity, which holds the limb at a spatial location.

=== Basis of consciousness in the brain ===
Since 2010 Graziano's lab has studied the brain basis of consciousness. Graziano proposed that specialized machinery in the brain computes the feature of awareness and attributes it to other people in a social context. The same machinery, in that hypothesis, also attributes the feature of awareness to oneself. Damage to that machinery disrupts one's own awareness.

The attention schema theory (AST) seeks to explain how an information-processing machine could act the way people do, insisting it has consciousness, describing consciousness in the ways that we do, and claiming that it has an inner magic that transcends mere information-processing, even though it does not. AST is currently being incorporated into artificial intelligence systems through the work of the international Astound project.

The proposed AST was partly motivated by two sets of previous findings.

First, certain regions of the cortex are recruited during social perception as people construct models of other people's minds. These regions include, among other areas, the superior temporal sulcus (STS) and the temporoparietal junction (TPJ) bilaterally but with a strong emphasis on the right hemisphere.

Second, when these same regions of cortex are damaged, people suffer from a catastrophic disruption of their own awareness of events and objects around them. The clinical syndrome of hemispatial neglect, or loss of awareness of one side of space, is particularly profound after damage to the TPJ or STS in the right hemisphere.

The conjunction of these two previous findings led to the suggestion that awareness may be a computed feature constructed by an expert system in the brain, that at least partly overlaps the TPJ and STS. In that proposal, the feature of awareness can be attributed to other people in the context of social perception. It can also be attributed to oneself, in effect creating one's own awareness.

Why construct the feature of awareness and attribute it to other people? In order to understand and predict the behavior of other people, it is useful to monitor other people's attentional state. Attention is a data handling method by which some signals in the brain are enhanced at the expense of others. According to the AST, when the brain computes that person X is aware of thing Y, it is in effect modeling the state in which person X is applying an attentional enhancement to signal Y. Awareness is an attention schema. In that theory, the same process can be applied to oneself. One's own awareness is a schematized model of one's own attention.

== Books ==
Graziano writes literary novels under his own name and children's novels under the pseudonym B. B. Wurge. His stated reason for the pseudonym is to ensure that children do not accidentally read the wrong category of book. His novels have been praised for their originality, vividness, and surreal imagination. His book for children, The Last Notebook of Leonardo, won the 2011 Moonbeam Award.

=== Literary novels ===
The Love Song of Monkey (2008)
Cretaceous Dawn (2008)
The Divine Farce (2009)
Death My Own Way (2012)

=== Children's novels (written under the name B. B. Wurge) ===
Billy and the Birdfrogs (2008)
Squiggle (2009)
The Last Notebook of Leonardo (2010)

=== Books on neuroscience ===
The Intelligent Movement Machine (2008)
God, Soul, Mind, Brain (2010)
Consciousness and the Social Brain (2013)
The Spaces Between Us: A Story of Neuroscience, Evolution, and Human Nature (2018)
Rethinking Consciousness: A Scientific Theory of Subjective Experience (2019)

=== Books on music ===
Three Modern Symphonies (2011)
Symphonies 4, 5, and 6 (2012)
Five String Quartets (2012)
