= Neolithic Settlement Vráble =

Neolithic settlement

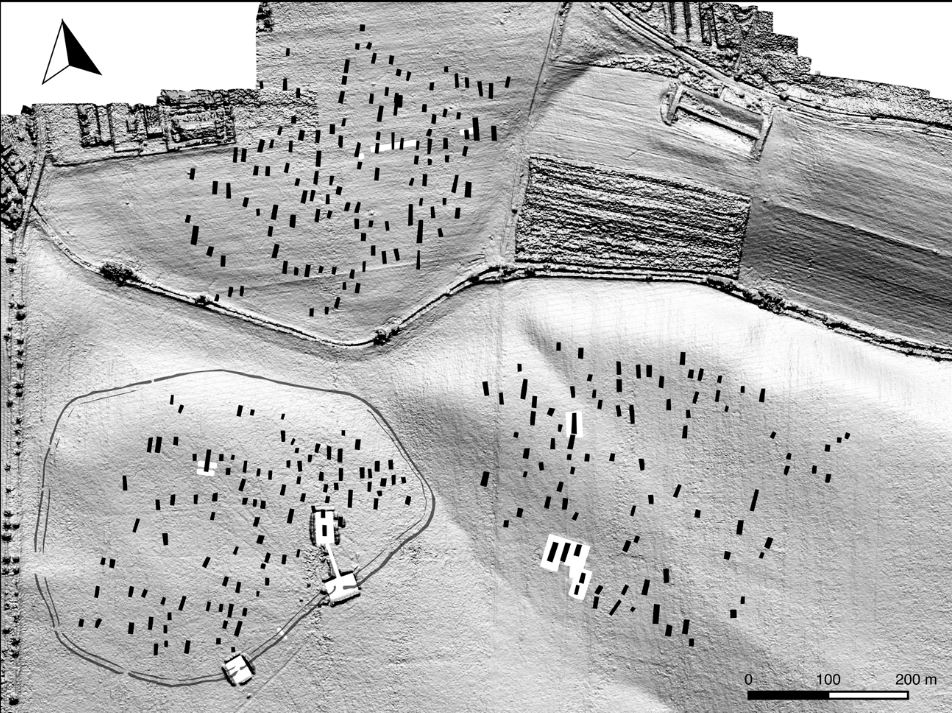
The interpretation of the geomagnetic plan: the rectangular black boxes represent the former longhouses.Three settlement agglomerations are clearly recognisable. The one in the south-west is surrounded by a ditch.

The Linear Pottery settlement Vráble-Veľké Lehemby is a significant archaeological site from the early Neolithic in southwestern Slovakia. It stands out from many other settlements of the Linear Pottery Culture due to several unique features, including the size of the settlement, the structure surrounded by a ditch, and the discovery of a mass grave containing numerous decapitated individuals. The settlement was discovered in 2009 and has been systematically excavated since 2012 by an international research team led by the Academy of Sciences in Nitra and by researchers from the Collaborative Research Centre 1266 at Kiel University.

== Location and settlement structure ==
The Vráble-Veľké Lehemby settlement consists of three clusters of houses. A total of 313 longhouses have been reconstructed, built over a period of about 200 to 300 years (c. 5250–5000 BCE). The overlapping of houses suggests that only a few houses existed at the same time. The settlement is particularly known for its ditch system, which surrounds the southwestern cluster of houses. This ditch is a rare feature in Linear Pottery settlements and was constructed about 200 years after the initial settlement, when the settlement had already reached a high population density.

== Finds and artefacts ==
The archaeological finds from Vráble include a variety of objects typical of the Linear Pottery culture, such as fired clay, ceramics, and flint tools. Notably, obsidian artifacts were found in all three settlement areas, though unevenly distributed. An obsidian core was discovered in one of the post pits. Additionally, one pendant made from Spondylus was found, possibly associated with a disturbed grave. The ceramic finds mostly belong to the late phase of the Linear Pottery culture (Želiezovce type), with a few sherds of Lengyel Culture and Bükk Culture, typically found in eastern Slovakia.

== Burials ==
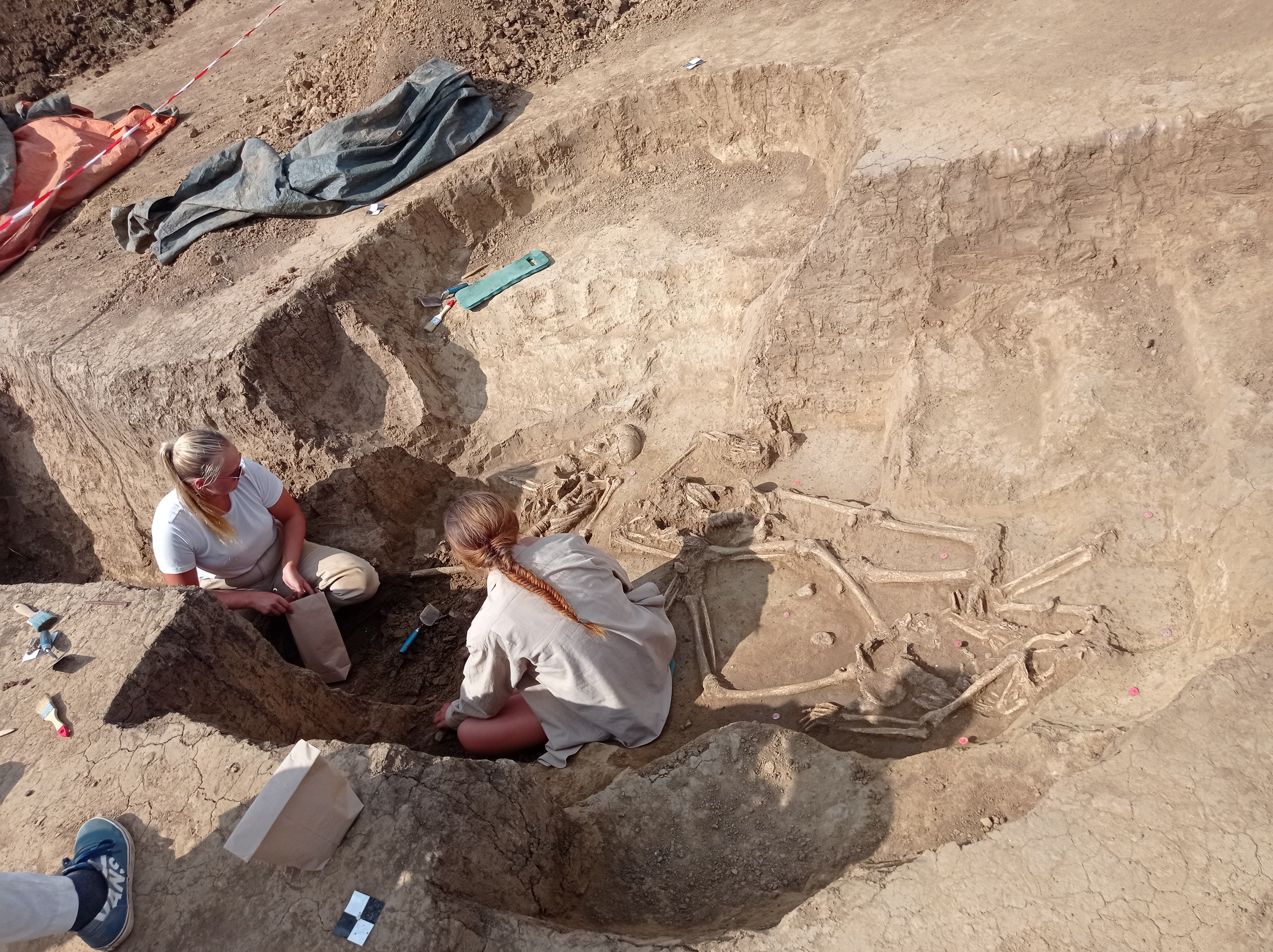
Students excavating three skeletons in the summer of 2021, two of which are headless.

A remarkable discovery at the settlement was the excavation of nearly 120 individuals in the area of the ditch. The burials can be divided into two main categories: regular burials in typical crouched positions with grave goods, and irregular burials, in which the heads of the deceased were often removed. A mass grave, discovered in 2021, contained numerous individuals buried in a stacked manner. To date, 81 people have been documented in this mass grave, almost all of whom were buried without heads. Only one infant was buried with its head. The reason for the absence of heads remains unclear.

== Geomagnetic surveys and house orientation ==
Geomagnetic surveys revealed numerous long pits, usually appearing in pairs, marking the position of the longhouses in between. The orientation of the houses shows a notable shift throughout the settlement's history: while the first houses were oriented at about 32°, later houses were aligned at around 4°. This change may reflect a psychological effect known as pseudoneglect, first identified in the Neolithic. In this phenomenon, people tend to make slight left or right deviations in their orientation, which may have been reflected in the alignment of the houses.

== Subsistence and economic system ==
The analysis of animal bones, plant remains, and stable isotopes from the settlement finds shows that the inhabitants of Vráble operated a well-organized subsistence system. There seems to have been a close spatial relationship between animal husbandry and agriculture, with the fields also being used as pastures to produce manure, which in turn increased crop yields. This intensive subsistence system may have contributed to higher productivity in Vráble and could have been a factor in the settlement's high population density and concentration.

== Social and cultural interpretation ==
The establishment of Vráble as a larger settlement within the Žitava Valley may be linked to a regional population peak in the 52nd century BCE. The high population density and the sophisticated economic system may have led to social tensions, which may be reflected in the enclosure of the southwestern settlement cluster. The openings of this ditch lead away from the other settlement areas, which could be a sign of these tensions.

The mass grave and unusual burial practices fit into a broader picture of social upheaval at the end of the Linear Pottery period, which can also be seen in other regions of Central Europe, such as the mass graves of Talheim or the enclosure Herxheim. These findings suggest a change in burial traditions and possibly the emergence of new social and cultural structures.

== Important publications ==
- Martin Furholt et al. 2020: Communality and Discord in an Early Neolithic Settlement Agglomeration: The LBK Site of Vráble, Southwest Slovakia in Cambridge Archaeological Journal, 30(3), pp. 469–489. doi:10.1017/S0959774320000049.
- Nils Müller-Scheeßel et al. 2021: New burial rites at the end of the Linearbandkeramik in south-west Slovakia in Antiquity, 95(379), pp. 65–84. https://doi.org/10.15184/aqy.2020.103.
- Nils Müller-Scheeßel, J. Müller, I. Cheben, W. Mainusch, K. Rassmann, K. et al. 2020: A new approach to the temporal significance of house orientations in European Early Neolithic settlements. PLOS ONE 15(1): e0226082. https://doi.org/10.1371/journal.pone.0226082
- Martin Furholt, I. Cheben, J. Müller, A. Bistáková, M. Wunderlich, N. Müller-Scheeßel 2020: Archaeology in the Žitava valley I. The LBK and Želiezovce settlement site of Vráble, Scales of Transformation in Prehistoric and Archaic Societies 09. Leiden: Sidestone Press. (Online).
- Ivan Cheben, M. Furholt, K. Rassmann, A. Bistakova, M. Wunderlich, N. Müller-Scheeßel 2024: Archaeology in the Žitava valley II. The neolithic landscape of south-western Slovakia, Scales of Transformation in Prehistoric and Archaic Societies 20. Leiden: Sidestone Press. (Online).
