= Jargon aphasia =

Feature of a language disorder involving noun selection difficulty

Jargon aphasia is a type of aphasia where the affected individual generates speech that is incomprehensible to the listeners. It is an instance of Wernicke's aphasia. People with jargon aphasia may replace a desired word with another that sounds or looks similar, is semantically related, or, in some cases, with random sounds. People with jargon aphasia often use neologisms, and may perseverate if they try to replace the words they cannot find with sounds.

== Causes ==
People affected by jargon aphasia usually are elderly and/or people who have damage to the neural pathways of certain parts of the brain. This is usually the result of the following conditions:

- Stroke
- Traumatic brain injury
- Epilepsy
- Migraine
- Brain tumor
- Alzheimer's disease
- Parkinson's disease

Since jargon is associated with fluent (Wernicke's) aphasia, it is usually caused by damage to the temporal lobe, and more specifically, Wernicke's area. After the condition is diagnosed, a CT or MRI scan is typically used to determine the location and severity of the brain damage that has caused the aphasia.

There have been cases in which aphasia has developed after damage to only the right hemisphere of the brain. These cases are few and far between, and usually involve unique circumstances for the individual. Most commonly, these results can stem from brain organization that is different from the general population, or a heavier than normal reliance on the right hemisphere of the brain.

== Diagnosis ==
Someone with jargon aphasia may exhibit the following behaviors:

- intermixing real words and nonsensical words while speaking or writing
- failing to recognize mistakes being made while speaking or writing
- using real words in incorrect situations
- frequent, repetitive uttering of low-frequency words
- the inability to say or write a specific word or phrase

Some of the specific types of language errors that occur are:

lexical (choosing an inappropriate word)

semantic
Real word that was semantically related to target. ("dog" instead of "cat")
formal
Real word that shared either the initial phoneme or at least 50% of phonemes with target. ("dog" instead of "desk" or "dog" instead of "frog")
mixed
Real word that was both semantically and phonologically related to target. ("bicycle" instead of "motorcycle")
visual
Real word of an item similar in visual form to the target. ("ball" instead of "orange")
unrelated
Real word that was not related to the target in any obvious way. ("dog" instead of "apple")

non-lexical (using a nonword)

phonological
Nonword that shared either the initial phoneme or at least 50% of phonemes with target. ("deg" instead of "dog")
neologistic
Nonword not reaching the criterion for phonological relatedness (i.e., sharing less than 50% of phonemes with the target and with a different initial phoneme). Nonwords that are pseudo-compound words. ("kib" instead of "dog")

other errors

Don't know
Indication that response was unknown or item was not responded to at all. ("I don’t know" or silence)
description
Attempts to describe as opposed to name item. (Multiple word responses)

Jargon aphasia must be diagnosed through a series of tests. Since the number of individuals that have aphasia after suffering a stroke is high, a test is usually carried out soon after the stroke occurs. There is a list of basic exercises to help assess a person's language skills, such as:

- naming objects that begin with a certain letter
- reading or writing
- holding a conversation
- understanding directions and commands

There is also a common test used, called the Boston Diagnostic Aphasia Examination test, which incorporates exercises that extensively review the person's language skills.

== Treatments ==
The only way to treat aphasia is with a speech-language pathologist (SLP). It will not completely restore the person's prior level of communication, but SLP can lead to a massive improvement of jargon aphasia. Recipients of this treatment typically achieve better use of residual language abilities, improved language skills, and the ability to communicate in a different way by making up for missing words in their speech.

One specific method that has shown to lead to improvements with certain symptoms is phonological component analysis, or PCA for short. Participants in PCA therapy tend to improve in the ability to name specific items that they are test on, as well as the decrease in use of nonwords to describe said items. Seeing promising results from this type of therapy has led to much optimism in hopes of developing more treatment methods for jargon aphasia.

== History ==
Hughlings Jackson is believed to have been the person who initially contributed the term "jargon" to aphasiology. He used this term not to distinguish a separate type of aphasia, but to describe the language output of certain people that was meaningless and incomprehensible to the listener, although it appeared to have some meaning for the speaker.

== Other meanings and types ==
There are many different meanings when people refer to jargon aphasia. Since Hughling Jackson's time, it has covered a broad range of similar verbal behaviors and has been used to describe a multitude of different aphiastic disturbances. Some of the behaviors are described as the person having speaking in a "confused, unintelligible language", "a strange, outlandish, or barbarous dialect", "a hybrid language", and can be referred to as a pretentious language marked by circumlocutions and long words. Observation of these behaviors has led to a branching of different types of jargon.

- Neologistic jargon is the production of language containing non-existent words that are not related to what the person is attempting to convey.
- Phonemic jargon is the production of language containing inappropriate words that are phonemically related to what the person is attempting to convey.
- Semantic jargon is the production of language which is devoid of content and consists of real words that are inappropriate given the context of the situation.

All of these types of jargon are seen in fluent aphasia, which can more commonly be addressed as Wernicke's aphasia.

== Contradictions and different viewpoints ==
Weinstein
Weinstein's viewpoint of jargon illustrates just the basic rambling and incoherent but structurally intact speech. It does not include details about neologisms and paraphasias. He and his coworkers view jargon as a positive symptom of aphasia, and as an adaptive behavior and form of denial, or anosognosia, in the presence of language deficit.
Schuell
Shuell views jargon as the result of severe impairment in the recall of learned auditory patterns and imperfect auditory feedback processes. The lack of control of verbal output is related to reduced auditory input.
Cohn and Neumann
Their viewpoint is that jargon results from the disruption of the sequential ordering of speech.
Alajouanine
Alajouanine's viewpoint highlights that the reason for jargon cannot be found in the breakdown of the intrinsic speech structure itself. He stressed that incomprehensibility and lack of meaning, rather than articulatory abnormality or lack of proper grammatical sequencing were the essence of jargon. He often spoke of a "suppression of the semantic values of language" in jargon.

== See also ==
- Anomic aphasia – another language disorder involving lexical-retrieval impairment.
