= Interlimb coordination =

Coordination of the left and right limbs

Human locomotion

Interlimb coordination is the coordination of the left and right limbs. It could be classified into two types of action: bimanual coordination and hands or feet coordination. Such coordination involves various parts of the nervous system and requires a sensory feedback mechanism for the neural control of the limbs. A model can be used to visualize the basic features, the control centre of locomotor movements, and the neural control of interlimb coordination. This coordination mechanism can be altered and adapted for better performance during locomotion in adults and for the development of motor skills in infants. The adaptive feature of interlimb coordination can also be applied to the treatment for CNS damage from stroke and the Parkinson's disease in the future.

== Types of interlimb coordination ==
=== Bimanual coordination ===
Bimanual coordination involves the coordination of two arms in bimanual action, which allows two hands to move simultaneously to do tasks. Examples of bimanual coordination include clapping hands, opening the cap of a bottle with two hands or typing words on a keyboard with both hands.

=== Hands/ feet coordination ===
Hands/ feet coordination involves the coordination of the upper limbs and the lower limbs, including the ipsilateral side of the body (e.g. left hand and left foot), or the contralateral side (both sides of the limbs). Examples include walking and climbing.

== Mechanisms of interlimb coordination ==
=== Nervous system involved in interlimb coordination ===
Different parts of the brain are included in such coordination, including the premotor cortex (PMC), the parietal cortex, the mesial motor cortices, the supplementary motor area, the cingulate motor cortex, the primary motor cortex cerebellum and the spinal cord.

=== Sensory feedback mechanism ===
Sensory feedback mechanism is involved in interlimb coordination. The sensory receptors including muscle spindles, golgi tendon organs in the limbs will first be stimulated by the external stimuli (e.g. pressure of touching an object), then generate sensory feedbacks and send information to the nervous system through the afferent pathways. After receiving the feedback, the central nervous system (CNS) will then generate an internal schema of the orientation and motion of the limbs, which allows the nervous system to monitor the consequence of action so that efficient sensory regulation of the limbs could be made. This allows independent modification of the movements of the limb to better manipulate the tasks.

==== Types of sensory feedback mechanism ====
There are two types of sensory feedback, intrinsic and extrinsic pathways. Intrinsic feedback will be received only from the organism's own movement, which means it is the internal physical feeling of the movement performed by the organism. For example, a person can feel its movement of making a fist without any external stimulus because it requires the folding of the fingers tightly into the centre of the palm and placing of the thumb over the folding fingers. In contrast, extrinsic feedback to be received must be provided from external sources from the environment. For instance, our fingers can detect heat from boiling water and pain from the poking of needle because the heat and pain receptors receive external stimuli from the surroundings.

== Modelization of interlimb coordination ==
=== Basic features ===
The coordination of interlimb can be represented by an integrated model which contains a central pattern generator (CPG), nonlinear muscles, hexahedral geometry, and a representative proprioceptive sensory pathway. One-dimensional phase oscillators are used to stimulate the movement of agonist-antagonist muscle pairs. Different phases of the oscillators are responsible to demonstrate the movements between the limbs. A specific oscillator with respect to the specific muscle from a specific limb could show the progression and development of that limb through its movement, for instance, the progression and development of the step cycle of the left limb in walking motion. Reflex response (e.g. biceps contracts and triceps relaxes to bend the elbow) is also incorporated in the model using stereotypical spike trains to represent, such that the reflexive feedback mechanism can also be demonstrated during the movement of muscles.

=== Control centre of locomotor movements ===
The spinal cord is the core of the neural control of locomotion. This organ is the integrative centre of the CNS for motor control, it is done by receiving sensory information from peripheral receptors to control and adjust movements. The central pattern generator (CPG) from the model is simulated as a network of spinal neurons that controls the basic locomotor output. An effective locomotion of the model must involve a flexible coordination of spinal cord neuronal networks, thus allowing various gait patterns and independent use of the limbs. This flexible coordination can be accomplished by integrating the intrinsic regulation mechanism of the spinal cord, somatosensory feedback from the limbs and various supraspinal pathways in the model.

The mechanical linkages between the limbs and trunk is important for the stabilization of multi-limb coordination movements. In return, the CNS will receive information of mechanical state of the limbs and trunk as it interacts with the environment through somatosensory feedback from the periphery.

==== Control of arm-leg coordination during human locomotion ====
Rhythmic movement of the arms during bipedal walking is generated by passive biomechanical linkages and neural commands generated by spinal locomotor CPGs that control rhythmic arm and leg movements. Although movement of the arms is less important to maintain dynamic stability during bipedal walking, the arms remain rhythmically coordinated with the legs. The human CNS integrated new control mechanisms into circuits already present to meet the need for new functional demands.

The neural coupling between arms and legs can be presented by the association between electromyography (EMG) activity from the upper limb and leg kinematics. Muscles of the upper limb show rhythmic activity related to arm swing, even when the arm is paralyzed. The EMG activity shows that coordination of arm-leg movement still provide stimulation to the limb regardless to the mobility of limbs.

=== Schematic representation of the neural control of interlimb coordination ===
Each limb has its own spinal locomotor CPG, a schematic representation can illustrate the interactions between parts of the CPG controlling flexor and extensor activity.

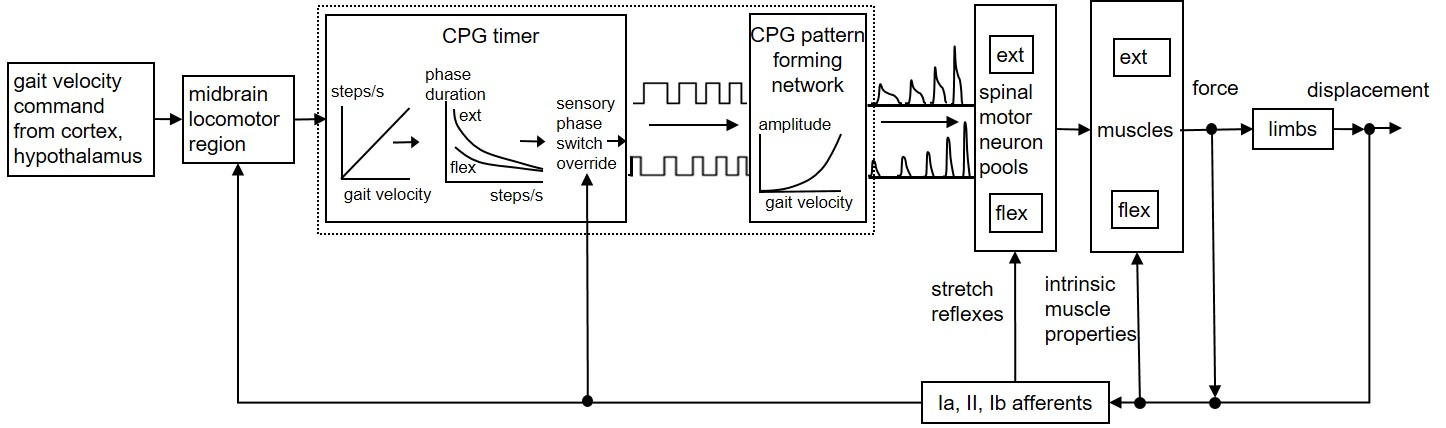
A schematic representation of the locomotor central pattern generator in the mammalian nervous system

== Adaptations of interlimb coordination ==
The control of interlimb coordination is precise and flexible, therefore humans can maintain dynamic stability in a continuously changing environment, such as changing speed, or transitioning from one gait pattern to another.

=== Change in adult gait patterns ===
Recent studies found out that adaptive changes only occur in interlimb coordination but do not occur in intralimb coordination (coordination on the same limb but different joints). A split-belt treadmill (a treadmill that contains two belts that can drive each leg at different speeds) was used in the experiment, this intervention alters the walking or running speed of the users. Participants were stimulated to walk at different speeds alternatively, and locomotor parameters were used to calculate the movement of limbs during the gait cycle. The subjects appeared to have new motor patterns after walking on the treadmill, which indicated that a new interlimb coordination pattern was adapted and stored in participants.

=== Development of motor skills in infants ===
Age was found to be related to changes in interlimb coordination such as the correlation between limb positions or between limb velocities. Changes and improvements in interlimb coordination by age are recognized to be a major phenomenon in the development of gross motor skills in infants. It was also found that a combination of movement of the arms and legs might be a precursor to some goal-directed behaviors such as reaching and grasping with the arms while walking with legs by infants.

== Future medical application related to interlimb coordination ==
=== CNS damage from stroke ===
Cerebral structures that are involved with stroke do not impair the adaptive ability of interlimb coordination and the storage of new interlimb relationships, and therefore patients of cerebral stroke are found to be able to adapt new mechanism of interlimb coordination. Given that the coordination of the limbs can be adaptively change, it is expected there is a possibility that the asymmetric walking patterns as a result of CNS damage from stroke could be improved by long-term adaptive rehabilitation strategies using a split-belt treadmill.

=== Parkinson's disease ===
Freezing of Gait (FOG) is a disabling symptom commonly found in Parkinson's Disease. FOG is a major contributor to fall risk in Parkinson's Disease patients and can only be partially relieved by medication. Parkinson's patients with FOG are known to have more difficulty with gait adaptation in their daily movements. Further, asymmetry of gait has been implicated in FOG as patients with FOG often fail to complete asymmetric tasks such as turning. Split-belt treadmill training (SBT), but not regular tied-belt treadmill training (TBT) can be used as a rehabilitation method for people with FOG by practicing their ability to adapt their gait pattern to asymmetrical circumstances. SBT improved gait adaptation immediately after the training and more importantly, improvements were retained up till 24 hours. The advantage of SBT is that it modulates gait more implicitly without attention being consciously drawn to the adaptation task. Furthermore, repeated adaptations of the gait pattern may improve the flexible adaptation of the movement to new tasks and may train motor switching, which could potentially improve motor performance in a more sustained manner. In addition, the cerebellar circuits became more involved in the processing of gait adaptation with repeated exposure to SBT, which may possibly lead to improvement in balancing and hence reduce the risk of falling.
