= Galvanic vestibular stimulation =

Electricity applied to the inner ear

Brain adaptation after 12 weeks of exposure to galvanic vestibular stimulation.

Galvanic vestibular stimulation is the process of sending specific electric messages to a nerve in the ear that maintains balance. There are two main groups of receptors in the vestibular system: the three semi-circular canals, and the two otolith organs (the utricle and the saccule). This technology has been investigated for both military and commercial purposes. The technology is being applied in Atsugi, Japan, the Mayo Clinic in the US, and a number of other research institutions around the world. It is being investigated for a variety of applications, including biomedical, pilot training, and entertainment. Not much is known about galvanic vestibular stimulation, but more scientists are continuing to research the topic.

A patient undergoing GVS noted:

I felt a mysterious, irresistible urge to start walking to the right whenever the researcher turned the switch to the right. I was convinced—mistakenly—that this was the only way to maintain my balance.

The phenomenon is painless but dramatic. Your feet start to move before you know it. I could even remote-control myself by taking the switch into my own hands.
