= Josef Gerstmann =

Jewish Austrian-born American neurologist

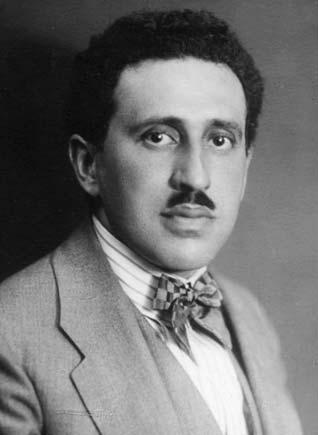
Josef Gerstmann, circa 1930 (Bildersammlung/Sammlungen der Medizinischen Universität Wien)

Josef Gerstmann (July 17, 1887, in Lemberg – March 23, 1969, in New York City) was a Jewish Austrian-born American neurologist.

Gerstmann studied medicine at the Medical University in Vienna, then capital of the Austro-Hungarian Empire, between 1906 and 1912 graduating in 1912. During World War I he served with distinction as the sanitary officer. Subsequently, he worked at the Clinic for Psychiatry-Neurology in Vienna with Wagner-Jauregg, and, after becoming professor, he became the chief of Neurological Institute Maria-Theresien-Schlössel, Vienna in 1930. Being Jewish, he emigrated with his wife Martha to the United States in 1938, escaping the Nazi Anschluss.

Initially Gerstmann worked at the Springfield / Ohio State Hospital, and from 1940 to 1941 as a research assistant and as a consultant neurologist at St. Elisabeth Hospital in Washington. 1941 he moved to New York and became a research associate at the New York Neurological Institute and an attending neuropsychiatrist at Goldwater Memorial Hospital. Gerstmann opened a private practise at 240 Central Park South. He was named an honorary member of the American Psychiatric Association and Academy of Neurology, a member of the American Psychopathological Association, Psychotherapeutic Society, Pirquet Society and the Rudolf Virchow Society. Gerstmann died on March 23, 1969, in his New York apartment.

Gerstmann syndrome and Gerstmann–Sträussler–Scheinker syndrome are named after him.

== Selected works ==
- "Beiträge zur Pathologie des Rückenmarks". Zeitschrift für die gesamte Neurologie und Psychiatrie 29, 1, 97-167, 1915 doi:10.1007/BF02897494
- Gerstmann J, Schilder P. "Zur Kenntnis der Bewegungsstörungen der Pseudosklerose". Zeitschrift für die gesamte Neurologie und Psychiatrie 58, 1, 33–41, 1920 doi:10.1007/BF02902023
- "Über die Einwirkung der malaria tertiana auf die progressive Paralyse". Zeitschrift für die gesamte Neurologie und Psychiatrie, 1920
- Die Malariabehandlung der progressiven Paralyse. Wiedeń, 1925; 2. wydanie 1928.
- "Beitrag zur Kenntnis der Entwicklungsstörungen in der Hirnrinde bei genuiner Epilepsie, Idiotie, juveniler Paralyse und Dementia praecox". Arbeiten Neurol Inst Wiener Univ 21:286–313 (1916)
- "Fingeragnosie. Eine umschriebene Störung der Orientierung am eigenen Körper". Wiener Klin Wochenschr 37:1010–1012 (1924)
- Gerstmann J, Schilder P. "Studien über Bewegungsstörungen". Zeitschrift für die gesamte Neurologie und Psychiatrie 70, 1, 35–54, 1921 doi:10.1007/BF02867524
- "Zur Frage der Umwandlung des klinischen Bildes der Paralyse in eine halluzinatorisch-paranoide Erscheinungsform im Gefolge der Malariaimpfbehandlung". Zeitschrift für die gesamte Neurologie und Psychiatrie 93, 1, 200–218, 1924 doi:10.1007/BF02900053
- Gerstmann J, Schilder P. Mikrographie bei Sensorisch-Aphasischen. 1925 doi:10.1007/BF01814177
- "Fingeragnosie und isolierte Agraphie; ein neues Syndrom". Zeitschr Gesamte Neurol Psychiatr (Berlin) 108:152–177 (1927)
- "Über ein noch nicht beschriebenes Reflexphänomen bei einer Erkrankung des zerebellaren Systems". Wiener Med Wochenschr 78:906–908 (1928)
- "Über ein neuartiges hirnpathologisches Phänomen". Wiener Klin Wochenschr 50:294–296 (1928)
- Gerstmann J, Kestenbaum A. "Monokuläres Doppeltsehen bei cerebralen Erkrankungen". Zeitschrift für die gesamte Neurologie und Psychiatrie 128, 1–4, 42–56, 1930 doi:10.1007/BF02864243
- Gerstmann J, Sträussler E. Zum Problemgebiet der Encephalomyelitis und der multiplen Sklerose. 1931
- "Zur Symptomatologie der Stirnhirnerkrankungen". Mschr Psychiat Neurol 1936;93:102-110 doi:10.1159/000148805
- THE PHENOMENON OF BODY ROTATION IN FRONTAL LOBE LESIONS. 1940
- "Some notes on the Gerstmann syndrome". Neurology 7: 866–869 (1957)
- PSYCHOLOGICAL AND PHENOMENOLOGICAL ASPECTS OF DISORDERS OF THE BODY IMAGE. The Journal of Nervous and Mental Disease, 1958
- "Right-Left Discrimination and Finger Localization". The Journal of Nervous and Mental Disease, 1960
- "Some posthumous notes on the Gerstmann syndrome" by J. Gerstmann. Wiener Zeitschr Nervenheilk 28:12–19 (1970)

== See also ==
- Gerstmann
