= Hemispatial neglect =

Asymmetrically-impaired spatial awareness due to a brain hemisphere being damaged

- Other names: Hemiagnosia, hemineglect, unilateral neglect, spatial neglect, contralateral neglect, unilateral visual inattention, hemi-inattention, neglect syndrome, one-side neglect, or contralateral hemispatialagnosia
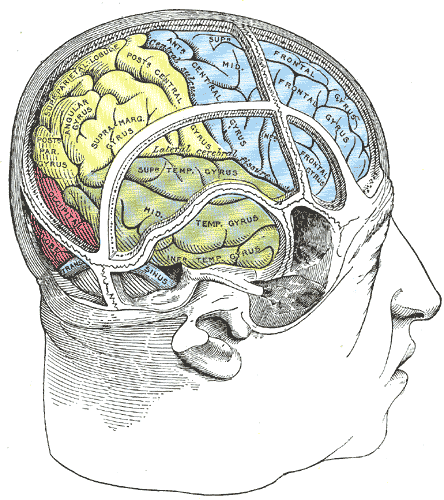
- Hemispatial neglect is most frequently associated with a lesion of the right parietal lobe (in yellow, at top).
- Specialty: Psychiatry, Neurology

Hemispatial neglect is a neuropsychological condition in which, after damage to one hemisphere of the brain (e.g. after a stroke), a deficit in attention and awareness towards the side of space opposite brain damage (contralesional space) is observed. It is defined by the inability of a person to process and perceive stimuli towards the contralesional side of the body or environment. Hemispatial neglect is very commonly contralateral to the damaged hemisphere, but instances of ipsilesional neglect (on the same side as the lesion) have been reported.

== Presentation ==
Hemispatial neglect results most commonly from strokes and brain unilateral injury to the right cerebral hemisphere, with rates in the critical stage of up to 80% causing visual neglect of the left-hand side of space. Neglect is often produced by massive strokes in the middle cerebral artery region and is variegated, so that most sufferers do not exhibit all of the syndrome's traits. Right-sided spatial neglect is rare because there is processing of the right space by both the left and right cerebral hemispheres, whereas in most left-dominant brains the left space is only processed by the right cerebral hemisphere. Although it most strikingly affects visual perception ('visual neglect'), neglect in other forms of perception can also be found, either alone or in combination with visual neglect.

For example, a stroke affecting the right parietal lobe of the brain can lead to neglect for the left side of the visual field, causing a patient with neglect to behave as if the left side of sensory space is nonexistent (although they can still turn left). In an extreme case, a patient with neglect might fail to eat the food on the left half of their plate, even though they complain of being hungry. If someone with neglect is asked to draw a clock, their drawing might show only the numbers 12 to 6, or all 12 numbers might be on one half of the clock face with the other half distorted or blank. Neglect patients may also ignore the contralesional side of their body; for instance, they might only shave, or apply make-up to, the non-neglected side. These patients may frequently collide with objects or structures such as door frames on the side being neglected.

Neglect may also present as a delusional form, where the patient denies ownership of a limb or an entire side of the body. Since this delusion often occurs alone, without the accompaniment of other delusions, it is often labeled as a monothematic delusion.Neglect not only affects present sensation but memory and recall perception as well. A patient suffering from neglect may also, when asked to recall a memory of a certain object and then draw said object, draw only half of the object. It is unclear, however, if this is due to a perceptive deficit of the memory (to the patient having lost pieces of spatial information of the memory) or whether the information within the memory is whole and intact but simply being ignored, the same way portions of a physical object in the patient's presence would be ignored.

Some forms of neglect may also be very mild—for example, in a condition called extinction where competition from the ipsilesional stimulus impedes perception of the contralesional stimulus. These patients, when asked to fixate on the examiner's nose, can detect fingers being wiggled on the affected side. If the examiner's fingers were wiggled on both the affected and unaffected sides of the patient, the patient will report seeing movement only on the ipsilesional side.

== Language and communication impairments ==
Although hemispatial neglect is most commonly described as a visuospatial disorder, research shows that it also produces systematic impairments in language comprehension, reading, writing, inference, and discourse-level processing. These deficits arise because neglect reduces attention to information presented on the left side of space, the left side of visual words and sentences, and the left side of communicative scenes or narratives.

=== Neglect dyslexia ===
Neglect often causes characteristic reading errors, sometimes termed neglect dyslexia or hemispatial dyslexia. Individuals may read only the right portion of words or sentences, omit initial letters, or substitute right-side components for full items. For example, a patient may read "Whitehouse" as "house," or read only the final words on each line of text. These errors show impaired distribution of visuospatial attention to the left hemifield rather than deficiencies in phonology or semantics. Neglect dyslexia improves when text is shifted toward the right visual field. This further demonstrates its dependence on spatial attention rather than linguistic ability.

=== Neglect dysgraphia ===
Writing may also be affected. Patients frequently confine their writing to the right side of the page, omit leftward characters, or fail to complete words extending into the neglected hemispace. In dictation tasks, the left margin often collapses, with text drifting progressively rightward. These errors signal spatial bias and often improve as attentional deficits recover. Patients may also show difficulty placing words or maintaining spatial layout on a page, consistent with disruption of visuospatial attention.

=== Discourse comprehension and inferencing ===
Hemispatial neglect and right hemisphere damage can impair higher-level language functions that require integrating information across a narrative, picture, or conversational context. Individuals may fail to incorporate critical cues that appear on the left side of these contexts, leading them to misinterpret events. Their narrative descriptions often focus disproportionately on right-sided details. Sentence-level linguistic abilities are preserved, making it clear that the deficit lies in integrating context, not in language itself. Narrative performance commonly shows reduced coherence and difficulty integrating themes or connecting events, proving right-hemisphere functions in managing discourse.

=== Pragmatic and communicative difficulties ===
Neglect can affect how people use language in conversation, making it harder to take turns, stay on topic, or draw on shared context. They may give descriptions that are too brief and miss important left-sided details, or they may talk only about the right-side elements. Combining spatial and contextual cues during communication is more difficult for these individuals. Note that basic language abilities remain intact.

=== Effects ===
Though it is frequently underappreciated, unilateral neglect can have dramatic consequences. It has more negative effect on functional ability, as measured by the Barthel ADL index, than age, sex, power, side of stroke, balance, proprioception, cognition, and premorbid ADL status. Its presence within the first 10 days of a stroke is a stronger predictor of poor functional recovery after one year than several other variables, including hemiparesis, hemianopsia, age, visual memory, verbal memory, and visuoconstructional ability. Neglect is probably among the reasons patients with right hemisphere damage are twice as likely to fall as those with left-side brain damage. Patients with neglect take longer to rehabilitate and make less daily progress than other patients with similar functional status. Patients with neglect are also less likely to live independently than patients who have both severe aphasia and right hemiparesis.

== Causes ==
Brain areas in the parietal and frontal lobes are associated with the deployment of attention (internally, or through eye movements, head turns or limb reaches) into contralateral space. Neglect is most closely related to damage to the temporo-parietal junction and posterior parietal cortex. The lack of attention to the left side of space can manifest in the visual, auditory, proprioceptive, and olfactory domains. Although hemispatial neglect often manifests as a sensory deficit (and is frequently co-morbid with sensory deficit), it is essentially a failure to pay sufficient attention to sensory input.

Although hemispatial neglect has been identified following left hemisphere damage (resulting in the neglect of the right side of space), it is most common after damage to the right hemisphere. This disparity is thought to reflect the fact that the right hemisphere of the brain is specialized for spatial perception and memory, whereas the left hemisphere is specialized for language - there is redundant processing of the right visual fields by both hemispheres. Hence the right hemisphere is able to compensate for the loss of left hemisphere function, but not vice versa. Neglect is not to be confused with hemianopsia. Hemianopsia arises from damage to the primary visual pathways cutting off the input to the cerebral hemispheres from the retinas. Neglect is damage to the processing areas. The cerebral hemispheres receive the input, but there is an error in the processing that is not yet well understood.

== Theories of mechanism ==
Researchers have debated about whether neglect is a disorder of spatial attention or spatial representation, or even non-spatial deficits of attention combined with a directional bias that results from unilateral brain injury.

=== Spatial attention ===
Spatial attention is the process where objects in one location are chosen for processing over objects in another location. This would imply that neglect is more intentional. The patient has an affinity to direct attention to the unaffected side. Neglect is caused by a decrease in stimuli in the contralesional side because of a lack of ipsilesional stimulation of the visual cortex and an increased inhibition of the contralesional side.

In this theory, neglect is seen as disorder of attention and orientation caused by disruption of the visual cortex. Patients with this disorder will direct attention and movements to the ipsilesional side and neglect stimuli in the contralesional side despite having preserved visual fields. The result of all of this is an increased sensitivity of visual performance in the unaffected side. The patient shows an affinity to the ipsilesional side being unable to disengage attention from that side.

=== Spatial representation ===
Spatial representation is the way space is represented in the brain. In this theory, it is believed that the underlying cause of neglect is the inability to form contralateral representations of space. In this theory, neglect patients demonstrate a failure to describe the contralesional side of a familiar scene, from a given point, from memory.

To support this theory, evidence from Bisiach and Luzzatti's study of Piazza del Duomo can be considered. For the study, patients with hemispatial neglect, that were also familiar with the layout of the Piazza del Duomo square, were observed. The patients were asked to imagine themselves at various vantage points in the square, without physically being in the square. They were then asked to describe different landmarks around the square, such as stores. At each separate vantage point, patients consistently only described landmarks on the right side, ignoring the left side of the representation. However, the results of their multiple descriptions at the different vantage points showed that they knew information around the entire square, but could only identify the right side of the represented field at any given vantage point. When asked to switch vantage points so that the scene that was on the contralesional side is now on the ipsilesional side the patient was able to describe with details the scene they had earlier neglected.

The same patterns can be found with comparing actual visual stimuli to imaging in the brain (Rossetti et al., 2010). A neglect patient who was very familiar with the map of France was asked to name French towns on a map of the country, both by a mental image of the map and by a physical image of the map. The image was then rotated 180 degrees, both mentally and physically. With the mental image, the neglect stayed consistent with the image; that is, when the map was in its original orientation, the patient named towns mostly on the East side of France, and when they mentally rotated the map they named towns mostly on the West side of France because the West coast was now on the right side of the represented field. However, with the physical copy of the map, the patient's focus was on the East side of France with either orientation. This leads researchers to believe that neglect for images in memory may be disassociated from the neglect of stimuli in extrapersonal space. In this case patients have no loss of memory making their neglect a disorder of spatial representation which is the ability to reconstruct spatial frames in which the spatial relationship of objects, that may be perceived, imagined or remembered, with respect to the subject and each other are organized to be correctly acted on.

This theory can also be supported by neglect in dreams (Figliozzi et al., 2007). The study was run on a neglect patient by tracking his eye movements while he slept, during the REM cycle. Results showed that the majority of the eye movements were aimed to his right side, indicating that the images represented in his dreams were also affected by hemispatial neglect.

Another example would be a left neglect patient failing to describe left turns while describing a familiar route. This shows that the failure to describe things in the contralesional side can also affect verbal items. These findings show that space representation is more topological than symbolic. Patients show a contralesional loss of space representation with a deviation of spatial reference to the ipsilesional side. In these cases we see a left-right dissimilarity of representation rather than a decline of representational competence.

== Diagnosis ==
=== Neglect test ===
Some of the neglect tests.

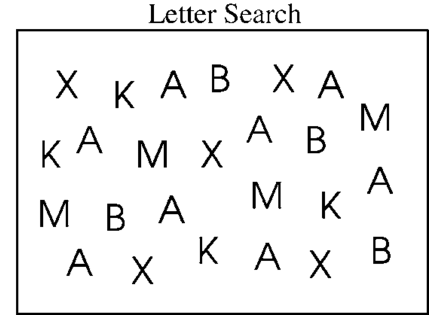
Letter search neglect test

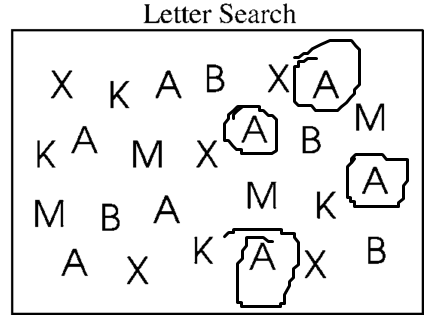
Letter search neglect test result

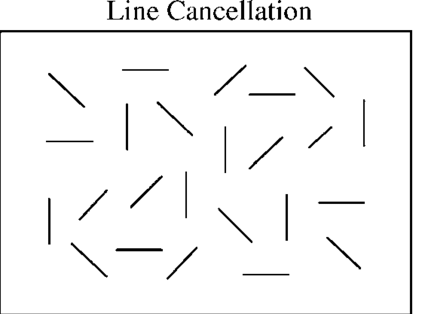
Line cancellation neglect test

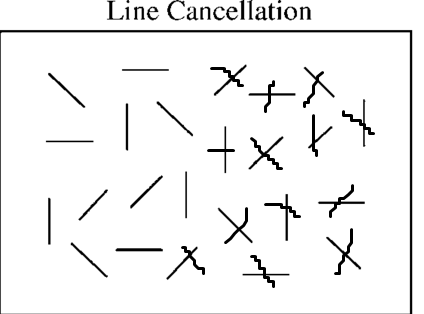
Line cancellation neglect test result

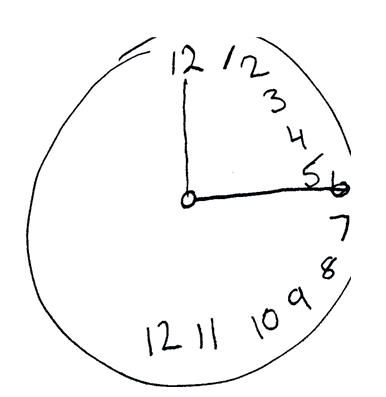
The Allochiria phenomenon might be revealed by the request to draw a clock.

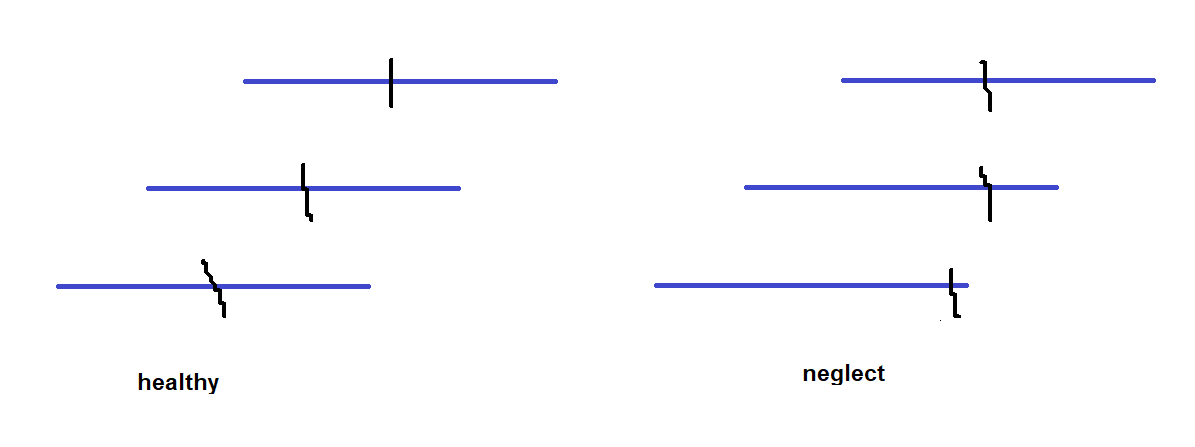
The patients has to mark the half of the line.

In order to assess not only the type but also the severity of neglect, doctors employ a variety of tests, most of which are carried out at the patient's bedside. Perhaps one of the most-used and quickest is the line bisection. In this test, a line a few inches long is drawn on a piece of paper and the patient is then asked to dissect the line at the midpoint. Patients exhibiting, for example, left-sided neglect will exhibit a rightward deviation of the line's true midpoint.

Another widely used test is the line cancellation test. Here, a patient is presented with a piece of paper that has various lines scattered across it and is asked to mark each of the lines. Patients who exhibit left-sided neglect will completely ignore all lines on the left side of the paper.

Visual neglect can also be assessed by having the patient draw a copy of a picture with which they are presented. If the patient is asked to draw a complex picture they may neglect the entire contralesional side of the picture. If asked to draw an individual object, the patient will not draw the contralesional side of that object.

A patient may also be asked to read a page out of a book. The patient will be unable to orient their eyes to the left margin and will begin reading the page from the center. Presenting a single word to a patient will result in the patient either reading only the ipsilesional part of the word or replacing the part they cannot see with a logical substitute. For example, if they are presented with the word "peanut", they may read "nut" or say "walnut".

=== Varieties ===
Neglect is a heterogenous disorder that manifests itself radically differently in different patients. No single mechanism can account for these different manifestations. A vast array of impaired mechanisms are found in neglect. These mechanisms alone would not cause neglect. The complexity of attention alone—just one of several mechanisms that may interact—has generated multiple competing hypothetical explanations of neglect. So it is not surprising that it has proven difficult to assign particular presentations of neglect to specific neuroanatomical loci. Despite such limitations, we may loosely describe unilateral neglect with four overlapping variables: type, range, axis, and orientation.

==== Type ====
Types of hemispatial neglect are broadly divided into disorders of input and disorders of output. The neglect of input, or "inattention", includes ignoring contralesional sights, sounds, smells, or tactile stimuli. Surprisingly, this inattention can even apply to imagined stimuli. In what's termed "representational neglect", patients may ignore the left side of memories, dreams, and hallucinations.

Output neglect includes motor and pre-motor deficits. A patient with motor neglect does not use a contralesional limb despite the neuromuscular ability to do so. One with pre-motor neglect, or directional hypokinesia, can move unaffected limbs ably in ipsilateral space but have difficulty directing them into contralesional space. Thus a patient with pre-motor neglect may struggle to grasp an object on the left side even when using the unaffected right arm.

==== Range ====
Hemispatial neglect can have a wide range in terms of what the patient neglects. The first range of neglect, commonly referred to as "egocentric" neglect, is found in patients who neglect their own body or personal space. These patients tend to neglect the opposite side of their lesion, based on the midline of the body, head, or retina. For example, in a gap detection test, subjects with egocentric hemispatial neglect on the right side often make errors on the far right side of the page, as they are neglecting the space in their right visual field.

The next range of neglect is "allocentric" neglect, where individuals neglect either their peri-personal or extrapersonal space. Peri-personal space refers to the space within the patient's normal reach, whereas extrapersonal space refers to the objects/environment beyond the body's current contact or reaching ability. Patients with allocentric neglect tend to neglect the contralesional side of individual items, regardless of where they appear with respect to the viewer. For example, In the same gap detection test mentioned above, subjects with allocentric hemispatial neglect on the right side will make errors on all areas of the page, specifically neglecting the right side of each individual item.

This differentiation is significant because the majority of assessment measures test only for neglect within the reaching, or peri-personal, range. But a patient who passes a standard paper-and-pencil test of neglect may nonetheless ignore a left arm or not notice distant objects on the left side of the room.

In cases of somatoparaphrenia, which may be caused by personal neglect, patients deny ownership of contralesional limbs. Sacks (1985) described a patient who fell out of bed after pushing out what he perceived to be the severed leg of a cadaver that the staff had hidden under his blanket. Patients may say things like, "I don't know whose hand that is, but they'd better get my ring off!" or, "This is a fake arm someone put on me. I sent my daughter to find my real one."

==== Axis ====
Most tests for neglect look for rightward or leftward errors. But patients may also neglect stimuli on one side of a horizontal or radial axis. For example, when asked to circle all the stars on a printed page, they may locate targets on both the left and right sides of the page while ignoring those across the top or bottom.In a recent study, researchers asked patients with left neglect to project their midline with a neon bulb and found that they tended to point it straight ahead but position it rightward of their true midline. This shift may account for the success of therapeutic prism glasses, which shift left visual space toward the right. By shifting visual input, they seem to correct the mind's sense of midline. The result is not only the amelioration of visual neglect, but also of tactile, motor, and even representational neglect.

==== Orientation ====
An important question in studies of neglect has been: "left of what?" That is to say, what frame of reference does a subject adopt when neglecting the left half of his or her visual, auditory, or tactile field? The answer has proven complex. It turns out that subjects may neglect objects to the left of their own midline (egocentric neglect) or may instead see all the objects in a room but neglect the left half of each individual object (allocentric neglect).

These two broad categories may be further subdivided. Patients with egocentric neglect may ignore the stimuli leftward of their trunks, their heads, or their retinae. Those with allocentric neglect may neglect the true left of a presented object, or may first correct in their mind's eye a slanted or inverted object and then neglect the side then interpreted as being on the left. So, for example, if patients are presented with an upside-down photograph of a face, they may mentally flip the object right side up and then neglect the left side of the adjusted image. In another example, if patients are presented with a barbell, patients will more significantly neglect the left side of the barbell, as expected with right temporal lobe lesion. If the barbell is rotated such that the left side is now on the right side, patients will more significantly neglect the left side of the object, even though it is now on the right side of space. This also occurs with slanted or mirror-image presentations. A patient looking at a mirror image of a map of the World may neglect to see the Western Hemisphere despite their inverted placement onto the right side of the map.

Various neuropsychological research studies have considered the role of frame of reference in hemispatial neglect, offering new evidence to support both allocentric and egocentric neglect. To begin, one study conducted by Dongyun Li, Hans-Otto Karnath, and Christopher Rorden examined whether allocentric neglect varies with egocentric position. This experimental design consisted of testing eleven right hemispheric stroke patients. Five of these patients showed spatial neglect on their contralesional side, while the remaining six patients showed no spatial neglect. During the study, the patients were presented with two arrays of seven triangles. The first array ran from southwest to northeast (SW-NE) and the second array ran from southeast to northwest (SE-NW). In a portion of the experimental trials, the middle triangle in the array contained a gap along one side. Participants were tested on their ability to perceive the presence of this gap, and were instructed to press one response button if the gap was present and a second response button if the gap was absent.

To test the neglect frame of reference, the two different arrays were carefully situated so that gap in the triangle fell on opposite sides of the allocentric field. In the SW-NE array, the gap in the triangle fell on the allocentric right of the object-centered axis along which the triangle pointed. In the SE-NW configuration, the gap in the triangle fell on the allocentric left of the object-centered axis. Furthermore, varying the position of the arrays with respect to the participant's trunk midline was used to test egocentric neglect. The arrays were therefore presented at 0° (i.e. in line with the participant's trunk midline), at −40° left, and at +40° right. Ultimately, varying the position of the array within the testing visual field allowed for the simultaneous measurement of egocentric neglect and allocentric neglect. The results of this experimental design showed that the spatial neglect patients performed more poorly for the allocentric left side of the triangle, as well as for objects presented on the egocentric left side of the body. Furthermore, the poor accuracy for detecting features of the object on the left side of the object's axis was more severe when the objects were presented on the contralesional side of the body. Thus, these findings illustrate that both allocentric and egocentric biases are present simultaneously, and that egocentric information can influence the severity of allocentric neglect.

A second study, conducted by Moscovitch and Behrmann, investigated the reference frame of neglect with respect to the somatosensory system. Eleven patients with parietal lobe lesions and subsequent hemispatial neglect were analyzed during this experiment. A double simultaneous stimulation procedure was utilized, during which the patients were touched lightly and simultaneously on the left and right side of the wrist of one hand. The patients were tested both with their palms facing down and with their palms facing up. This experimental condition allowed the scientists to determine whether neglect in the somatosensory system occurs with respect to the sensory receptor surface (egocentric) or with respect to a higher-order spatial frame of reference (allocentric). The results of this experiment showed the hemispatial neglect patients neglected somatosensory stimuli on the contralesional side of space, regardless of hand orientation. These findings suggest that, within the somatosensory system, stimuli are neglected with respect to the allocentric, spatial frame of reference, in addition to an egocentric, sensory frame of reference. Ultimately, the discoveries made by these experiments indicate that hemispatial neglect occurs with respect to multiple, simultaneously derived frames of reference, which dictate the nature and extent of neglect within the visual, auditory, and tactile fields.

== Treatment ==
Treatment consists of finding ways to bring the patient's attention toward the left, usually done incrementally, by going just a few degrees past midline, and progressing from there. Rehabilitation of neglect is often carried out by neuropsychologists, occupational therapists, speech-language pathologists, neurologic music therapists, physical therapists, optometrists, and orthoptists.

Forms of treatment that have been tested with variable reports of success include prismatic adaptation, where a prism lens is worn to pull the vision of the patient towards the left, constrained movement therapy where the "good" limb is constrained in a sling to encourage use of the contralesional limb. Eye-patching has similarly been used, placing a patch over the "good" eye. Pharmaceutical treatments have mostly focused on dopaminergic therapies such as bromocriptine, levodopa, and amphetamines, though these tests have had mixed results, helping in some cases and accentuating hemispatial neglect in others. Caloric vestibular stimulation (CVS) has been shown to bring about a brief remission in some cases. however this technique has been known to elicit unpleasant side-effects such as nystagmus, vertigo and vomiting. A study done by Schindler and colleagues examined the use of neck muscle vibration on the contralesional posterior neck muscles to induce diversion of gaze from the subjective straight ahead. Subjects received 15 consecutive treatment sessions and were evaluated on different aspects of the neglect disorder including perception of midline, and scanning deficits. The study found that there is evidence that neck muscle stimulation may work, especially if combined with visual scanning techniques. The improvement was evident 2 months after the completion of treatment.

Other areas of emerging treatment options include the use of prisms, visual scanning training, mental imagery training, video feedback training, trunk rotation, galvanic vestibular stimulation (GVS), transcranial magnetic stimulation (TMS) and transcranial direct-current stimulation (tDCS). Of these emerging treatment options, the most studied intervention is prism adaptation and there is evidence of relatively long-term functional gains from comparatively short-term usage. However, all of these treatment interventions (particularly the stimulation techniques) are relatively new and randomised, controlled trial evidence is still limited. Further research is mandatory in this field of research in order to provide more support in evidence-based practice.

In a review article by Pierce & Buxbaum (2002), they concluded that the evidence for Hemispheric Activation Approaches, which focuses on moving the limb on the side of the neglect, has conflicting evidence in the literature. The authors note that a possible limitation in this approach is the requirement for the patients to actively move the neglected limb, which may not be possible for many patients. Constraint-Induced Therapy (CIT), appears to be an effective, long-term treatment for improving neglect in various studies. However, the use of CIT is limited to patients who have active control of wrist and hand extension. Prism Glasses, Hemispatial Glasses, and Eye-Patching have all appeared to be effective in improving performance on neglect tests. Caloric Stimulation treatment appears to be effective in improving neglect; however, the effects are generally short-term. The review also suggests that Optokinetic Stimulation is effective in improving position sense, motor skills, body orientation, and perceptual neglect on a short-term basis. As with Caloric Stimulation treatment, long-term studies will be necessary to show its effectiveness. A few Trunk Rotation Therapy studies suggest its effectiveness in improving performance on neglect tests as well as the Functional Independence Measure (FIM). Some less studied treatment possibilities include treatments that target Dorsal Stream of visual processing, Mental Imagery Training, and Neck Vibration Therapy. Trunk rotation therapies aimed at improving postural disorders and balance deficits in patients with unilateral neglect, have demonstrated optimistic results in regaining voluntary trunk control when using specific postural rehabilitative devices. One such device is the Bon Saint Côme apparatus, which uses spatial exploratory tasks in combination with auditory and visual feedback mechanisms to develop trunk control. The Bon Saint Côme device has been shown to be effective with hemiplegic subjects due to the combination of trunk stability exercises, along with the cognitive requirements needed to perform the postural tasks.

== See also ==
- Agnosia (particularly mirror agnosia)
- Allochiria
- Anosognosia
- Blindsight
- Brain damage
- Crossmodal attention
- Delusion
- Dyschiria
- Hemimotor neglect
- Monothematic delusion
- Pseudoneglect
- Spatial cognition
