= Memory disorder =

Damage to the brain's memory capacity

Memory loss is the loss of memory, the faculty of the mind by which data or information is encoded, stored, and retrieved when needed. Memory loss is usually described as forgetfulness, absent-mindedness, or a physical or mental disorder such as amnesia. Memory loss can be partial or total, and it is normal when it comes with aging. Sudden memory loss is usually a result of brain trauma and it may be permanent or temporary. When it is caused by medical conditions such as Alzheimer's disease, the memory loss is gradual and tends to be permanent.

Memory disorders are the result of damage to neuroanatomical structures that hinders the storage, retention and recollection of memories. Memory disorders can be progressive, including Alzheimer's disease, or they can be immediate including disorders resulting from head injury.

Brain trauma is not the only factor that can cause sudden memory loss. It may appear as a side effect of statin drugs that are used as treatment for those who have hypercholesterolemia. Major causes of sudden loss of memory are strokes. Other causes are long lasting and recurrent illnesses such as meningitis or epilepsy. Either temporary or permanent memory loss can also result from chemical imbalances, exposure to toxic substances, allergies, vitamin deficiencies (such as those caused by alcoholism), or extreme mental illness (major depressive disorder).

== Symptoms ==
Symptoms of memory loss vary from person to person, but can include: forgetting dates and names; beginning a task but then forgetting the purpose of it; getting lost easily; repeating things over and over again, sometimes in the same conversation; and having difficulties performing familiar tasks such as driving or baking. They usually occur gradually and may vary in intensity depending on the cause of the condition.

Confusion or decreased alertness may be the first symptom of memory loss and also of serious illness, particularly in older adults.

The most worrisome symptoms are not those related to things that people forget to do. Some patients may have problems mixing up or remembering words for objects or can have trouble understanding or taking part in a conversation. Being unable to make a simple decision can suggest that something is not working as it should and medical advice should be sought.

Whether an individual suffers from memory loss is not decided only based on one's symptoms. In order to diagnose the condition a doctor will obtain a detailed medical history of the patient. The patient will also undergo several neuropsychological tests that will focus on his or her memory functions. Several other medical exams such as an electroencephalography, an MRI, or a CT scan can be performed in order to establish an accurate diagnosis.

The main type of memory loss is short-term memory. Short-term memory refers to memories that last for a few minutes.

== Causes ==
- Side effects of Medication: Many drugs can cause cognitive problems and memory loss as a side effects, common in adults. Common drugs that affect memory and brain function include sleeping pills, antihistamines, blood pressure and arthritis medication, antidepressants, anti-anxiety medications, and painkillers.
- Depression: Depression mimics the signs of memory loss. It is a common problem in older adults—especially if one is less social and active than they used to be or if one has recently experienced a number of major life changes (retirement, a serious medical diagnosis, the loss of a loved one, moving away from home).
- Vitamin B12 Deficiency: Vitamin B12 protects neurons and is vital to healthy brain functioning. A lack of B12 can cause permanent damage to the brain.

== Prevention ==
The most common preventable cause of memory loss is brain trauma, especially trauma resulting from head injury. Preventative measures such as wearing a seat belt while driving or a helmet while biking, can reduce the risk of head injury while participating in dangerous activities.

Eating nutritious foods and reducing stress may help prevent memory loss. In addition, it may be helpful to avoid risk factors such as alcohol abuse and exposure to toxic chemicals. As high blood pressure increases the risk for stroke, and therefore memory loss, blood pressure should be kept under control. Lifestyle adjustments such as smoking cessation and exercise can also further reduce the risk for stroke and brain trauma.

Some specialists recommend that patients drink enough water for better hydration. Sleep deprivation and stress are also thought to impact the proper functioning of the brain cells, so it is important to get enough rest and avoid stressful activities.

Socializing is also believed to be beneficial for individuals who may develop memory loss.

Patients who experience memory loss as a result of aging may keep their brain cells healthy and active with exercise and dietary supplements. However, although some dietary choices and lifestyle changes are suggested, it has not yet been proven to what extent these may reduce the risk of memory loss, especially that caused by aging. Dietary supplements that may be recommended include multivitamins and mineral complexes, boron, lecithin, garlic, gingko, vitamin B complex, zinc, copper, acetylcholine, DMAE, and vitamin C with bioflavonoid.

Patients whose memory loss is bothersome to the extent that it becomes an issue are encouraged to establish a routine and follow it. Making lists and associations, keeping a detailed calendar as well as always putting important objects in the same place might also help them in remembering more easily and faster. Some believe that people who develop mild symptoms of memory loss are more likely to prevent the worsening of the condition if they train their mind by playing strategy games, puzzle, word games or number puzzles and reading. Stimulating the brain is suggested to help patients slow down the processes that cause memory loss, however this is still being researched.

Memory loss among seniors is not inevitable, but is a normal occurrence for many as the brain slows down. This is not the same thing as dementia. Mental functions to do normal activities you have always done, life experience, common sense, and the ability to form reasonable judgments and arguments are not affected.

Exercise, especially aerobic exercise, helps combat or restore memory. Studies indicate that exercise lessens stress, increases blood flow, and stabilizes and deepens sleep patterns. Even walking a few times a week helps fight memory loss.

== Treatment ==
Memory loss can't be treated as of right now with our current medical technology and available treatments unless it is caused by a reversible condition. The treatment is greatly dependent on the primary cause of the condition. When memory loss is a symptom of a more severe disease, it may be reversed as soon as the underlying condition is identified and cured. Memory loss due to aging cannot currently be cured, but the symptoms may be improved by following the prevention measures.

Treating mild cases of memory loss may consist of herbal medications or a change in lifestyle. The other dietary supplements along with good quality and long sleep and avoiding potential risk factors may also improve the general status of the patient.

Family support plays an important role in treating memory loss. Family members are usually encouraged to take special orientation classes on how to cope with their sick relatives and how to help them improve their condition.

== Pathology ==
The memory is affected by the damage that may occur in the different parts of the brain such as medial temporal lobe, hippocampus, cortex and frontal lobes. Injuring any of these areas may lead to specific disruptions in the processes of acquiring and restoring memory. For instance, damage to the medial temporal lobe and hippocampus can devastate the ability to acquire new declarative memory whereas damage to the storage areas in cortex can disrupt retrieval of old memories and interfere with acquisition of new memories.

== In alphabetical order ==
=== Acquired brain injury (ABI) ===
Acquired brain injury (ABI) is brain damage caused by events after birth, rather than as part of a genetic or congenital disorder such as fetal alcohol syndrome, perinatal illness or perinatal hypoxia.

=== Agnosia ===
Agnosia is the inability to recognize certain objects, persons or sounds. Agnosia is typically caused by damage to the brain (most commonly in the occipital or parietal lobes) or from a neurological disorder. Treatments vary depending on the location and cause of the damage. Recovery is possible depending on the severity of the disorder and the severity of the damage to the brain. Many more specific types of agnosia diagnoses exist, including: associative visual agnosia, astereognosis, auditory agnosia, auditory verbal agnosia, prosopagnosia, simultanagnosia, topographical disorientation, visual agnosia etc.

=== Alzheimer's disease ===
Alzheimer's disease (AD) is a progressive, degenerative and fatal brain disease, in which cell to cell connections in the brain are lost. Alzheimer's disease is the most common form of dementia. Globally approximately 1–5% of the population is affected by Alzheimer's disease. Women are disproportionately affected by Alzheimer's disease. The evidence suggests that women with AD display more severe cognitive impairment relative to age-matched males with AD, as well as a more rapid rate of cognitive decline.

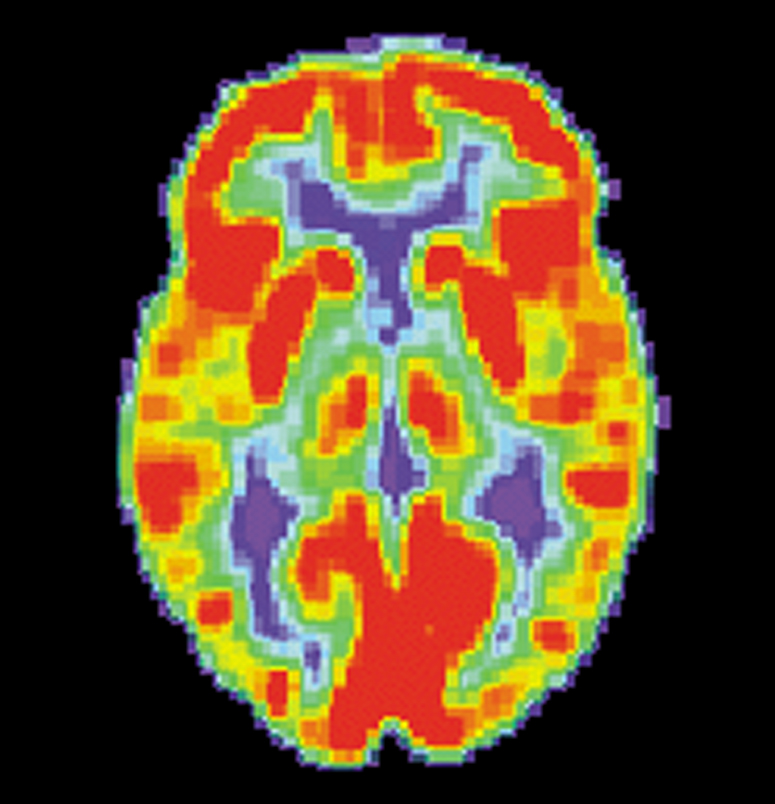
PET scan of a healthy brain - Image courtesy of US National Institute on Aging Alzheimer's Disease Education and Referral Center

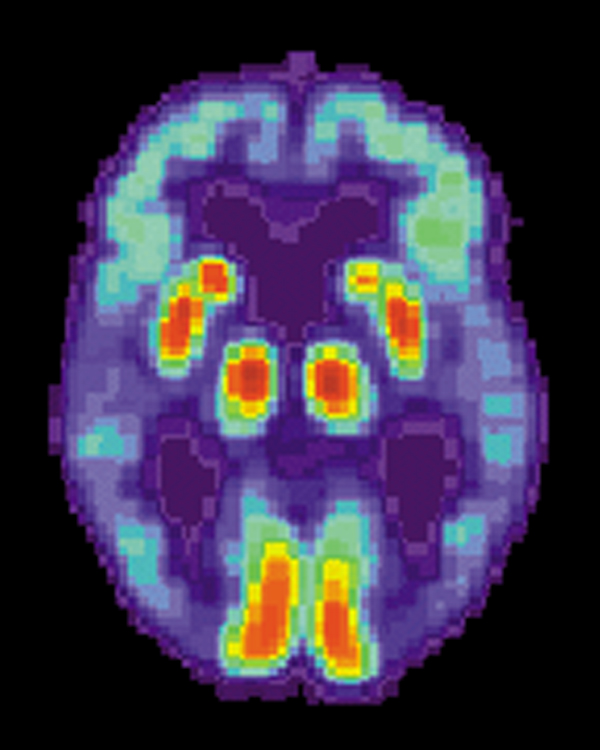
PET scan of brain with AD - Image courtesy of US National Institute on Aging Alzheimer's Disease Education and Referral Center

=== Amnesia ===
Amnesia is an abnormal mental state in which memory and learning are affected out of all proportion to other cognitive functions in an otherwise alert and responsive patient. There are two forms of amnesia: Anterograde amnesia and retrograde amnesia, that show hippocampal or medial temporal lobe damage. People with anterograde amnesia show difficulty in the learning and retention of information encountered after brain damage. People with retrograde amnesia generally have memories spared about personal experiences or context independent semantic information.

==== Brain injury ====
Causes of TBI

Traumatic brain injury (TBI) often occurs from damage to the brain caused by an outside force, and may lead to cases of amnesia depending on the severity of the injury. Head injury can give rise to either transient or persisting amnesia. Occasionally, post-traumatic amnesia (PTA) may exist without any retrograde amnesia (RA), but this is often more common in cases of penetrating lesions. Damage to the frontal or anterior temporal regions have been described to be associated with disproportionate RA. Studies have illustrated that during PTA, head injury patients showed accelerated forgetting of learned information. On the other hand, after PTA, forgetting rates were normal.

As noted in the above-mentioned section on traumatic brain injury it can be associated with memory impairment, Alzheimer's disease; however, as far as aging is concerned it poses other threats as well. There is evidence that supports a high incidence of falls among the elderly population and this is a leading cause of TBI-associated death among the population of people 75 years of age and older. When looking at the chart to the right on the page, it states that falls are only 28% of the total causes of TBI, so that would suggest that the elderly make up a good portion of that 28% overall. Another factor associated with TBI and age is the relationship between when the injury was sustained and the age at which it occurred. It is estimated that the older the individual, the more likely they would require assistance post TBI.

In some cases, individuals have reported having a particularly vivid memory for images or sounds occurring immediately before the injury, on regaining consciousness, or during a lucid interval between the injury and the onset of PTA. As a result, recent controversy has emerged about whether severe head injury and amnesia exclude the possibility of post-traumatic stress disorder (PTSD) symptoms. In a study carried out by McMillan (1996), patients reported ‘windows' of experience, in which emotional disturbance was sufficient to cause PTSD. These 'windows' involved recall of events close to impact (when RA was brief), of distressing events soon after the accident (when PTA was short), or of 'islands' of memory (e.g. hearing the screaming of others).

Brain injuries can also be the result of a stroke as the resulting lack of oxygen can cause damage to the location of the cerebrovascular accident (CVA). The effects of a CVA in the left and right hemispheres of the brain include short-term memory impairment, and difficulty acquiring and retaining new information.

=== Dementia ===
Dementia refers to a large class of disorders characterized by the progressive deterioration of thinking ability and memory as the brain becomes damaged. Dementia can be categorized as reversible (e.g. thyroid disease) or irreversible (e.g. Alzheimer's disease). Currently, there are more than 35 million people with dementia worldwide. In the United States alone the number of people affected by dementia is striking at 3.8 million.

While studies show that there are “normal” aspects to aging, such as graying hair and changes in vision, there are changes such as forgetting how to do things that are not considered “normal”. The importance of understanding that the changes most frequently observed and noticed on a daily basis concerning aging loved ones is imperative. While mild cognitive impairment can be considered a normal part of aging, the differences must be noted.

In one study by J. Shagam, it was noted that while Diabetes and Hypertension are not considered part of normal aging, they would be classified under mild cognitive impairment. With this being said, it is important to differentiate the differences with what can be potentially harmful and what is not. It is difficult to accurately diagnose dementia due to the fact that most people are unaware of what to be looking for and also because there is no specific test which can be given as a diagnostic tool.

What is even more evident is that the symptoms among dementia, Alzheimer's and Parkinson's related dementia tend to go beyond just one ailment. While there are different forms of dementia, Vascular dementia as it would sound is associated with vascular cautions.

This form of dementia is not a slow deterioration but rather a sudden and unexpected change due to heart attack or stroke significantly reducing blood to the brain. Research has shown that persistent hypertension can be contributory to the breakdown of the BBB. The blood-brain barrier (BBB) serves as a “gatekeeper” for the brain by keeping out water and other substances. Various studies show that as the brain ages the blood-brain barrier starts to break down and become dysfunctional. There are different ways to measure the thinning of the BBB and one that most are familiar with is imaging, this consists of taking pictures of the brain using CT scans, MRI, or PET scans.

Previous research also indicates that with aging and the thinning of the BBB, cognitive changes were also occurring within the section of the brain known as the hippocampus. This shows a relationship between aging and the thinning of the BBB and its effects on the brain. Also indicated by the aging brain are learning and memory impairments.

While changes to the BBB are not a cause of impairment to cognitive functions alone research suggests that there is a relationship. Another impairment which is indicative of brain aging and the breakdown of the BBB is the accretion of iron.

Too much iron in the body can create free radicals which could influence the degeneration of the blood-brain barrier. One other specific age related factor noted in Popescu et al. is a decrease in estrogen as one ages could adversely affect the breakdown of the blood-brain barrier and create a sensitivity to neurodegeneration. As pointed out earlier, dementia is a broad category of memory impairments most commonly associated with ageing. Another symptom which should be monitored is Type 2 diabetes, which can lead to vascular dementia.

Also linked with vascular dementia issues is high cholesterol; furthermore, this risk factor is related to cognitive decline, stroke, and Alzheimer's disease. It is estimated that within 20 years, worldwide prevalence will increase twofold. By 2050, this number is expected to increase to 115 million. Overall, dementia incidence is similar for men and women. However, after 90 years of age dementia incidence declines in men but not in women.

=== Hyperthymestic syndrome ===
Hyperthymestic syndrome causes an individual to have an extremely detailed autobiographical memory. Patients with this condition are able to recall events from every day of their lives (with the exception of memories before age five and days that were uneventful). This condition is very rare with only a few confirmed cases.

=== Huntington's disease ===
Huntington's disease (HD) is an inherited progressive disorder of the brain that leads to uncontrolled movements, emotional instability, and loss of intellectual faculties. Because of the inheritability of Huntington's each child born to a parent with Huntington's has a 50% chance of inheriting the disease, leading to a prevalence of almost 1 in 10,000 Canadians (0.01%).

The first signs of Huntington's Disease are generally subtle; those affected commonly note tics and twitching as well as unexplained fluctuations of mood. Clumsiness, depression and irritability are noted. What begins as a slurring and slowing of speech eventually leads to difficulty communicating, reliance on a wheelchair, or confinement to a bed.

=== Parkinson's disease ===
Parkinson's disease (PD) is a neurodegenerative disease. PD and aging share many of the same neuropathologic and behavioral features. Movement is normally controlled by dopamine; a chemical that carries signals between the nerves in the brain. When cells that normally produce dopamine die off, the symptoms of Parkinson's appear. This degeneration also occurs in normal aging but is a much slower process. The most common symptoms include: tremors, slowness, stiffness, impaired balance, rigidity of the muscles, and fatigue. As the disease progresses, non-motor symptoms may also appear, such as depression, difficulty swallowing, sexual problems or cognitive changes.

Another symptom associated with PD is memory dysfunction. This can be attributed to frontal lobe damage and presents itself in a manner which could be associated in normal aging. However, there is no certain correlation between normal aging and that of Parkinson's disease with relation to memory specifically. According to studies done in London and in Sicily, 1 in 1000 elderly citizens will be diagnosed with Parkinson's, although this can vary regionally and affect a large range of age groups.

Cognitive impairment is common in PD. Specific parkinsonian symptoms, bradykinesia and rigidity, have been shown to be associated with decline of cognitive function. The underlying neuropathological disturbance in PD involves selective deterioration of subcortical structures, and the executive dysfunction in PD, especially in processes that involve working memory. This has been shown to be related to decreased activation in the basal ganglia and frontal cortex. Elgh, Domellof, Linder, Edstrom, Stenlund, & Forsgren (2009) studied cognitive function in early Parkinson's disease and found that PD patients performed significantly worse than healthy controls in attention, episodic memory, category fluency, psychomotor function, visuospatial function and in several measures of executive function. Patients also exhibited greater difficulty with free recall that required a preserved executive function than with cued recall and recognition in tests of episodic memory.

According to a Japanese study, normal elderly subjects had difficulty with memory recognition and the PD elderly subjects had an even more troubling time with recognition than the normal group Another pertinent correlation made by this Japanese survey is that for PD patients their immediate memory response is intact while their ability to recognize memories from the past are inhibited. It is also said that PD patient memory is considered a selective impairment.

=== Stress ===
It has become clear that aging negatively affects brain function and this can encompass a decrease in locomotor activities and coordination as well as affect in a negative way learning and memory. Certain responses to stress within the hippocampus can have negative effects on learning. In a study done by Mark A. Smith, it is demonstrated that exposure to continuous stress can cause age-related issues to the hippocampus. What then becomes more noticeable is that the aging brain is not as able to recognize growth, this is a symptom of hippocampal damage. If the information is not being encoded properly in the brain then of course there would not be good memory retention without the consideration of outside implications. However, the consideration of anxiety, memory and overall function must be compromised. An emotional memory is capable of being embedded and then reused in a similar scenario at a later time if need be. Also noted within a study relating to age and anxiety and memory it was noted that lesions on the brain can affect spatial learning as well as sex presenting at a disadvantage. Dysfunction within the hippocampus can be a reason behind aging brain changes among the elderly. To sum up anxiety and memory and aging, it is useful to recognize a correlation between what anxiety can cause the body to do and how memories are then formed or not formed, and how the aging brain has enough difficulty on its own trying to perform recall tasks.

=== Wernicke–Korsakoff syndrome ===
Wernicke–Korsakoff syndrome (WKS) is a severe neurological disorder caused by thiamine (vitamin B_{1}) deficiency, and is usually associated with chronic excessive alcohol consumption. It is characterized clinically by oculomotor abnormalities, cerebellar dysfunction and an altered mental state. Korsakoff's syndrome is also characterized by profound amnesia, disorientation and frequent confabulation (making up or inventing information to compensate for poor memory). A survey published in 1995 indicated that there was no connection to the national average amount of alcohol ingested by a country in correlation to a range of prevalence within 0 and 2.5%.

Symptoms of Wernicke–Korsakoff syndrome include confusion, amnesia, and impaired short-term memory. WKS also tends to impair the person's ability to learn new information or tasks. In addition, individuals often appear apathetic and inattentive and some may experience agitation. WKS symptoms may be long-lasting or permanent and its distinction is separate from acute effects of alcohol consumption and from periods of alcohol withdrawal.

== Case studies ==
- A.J. (patient)

A.J. had a rare memory disorder called hyperthymestic syndrome. She had an inability to forget. Her autobiographical memory was extremely accurate to the point that she remembered every day of her life in detail (with some exceptions). She was unable to control what she remembered or what she forgot.

- Clive Wearing

Clive Wearing had anterograde amnesia after a rare case of herpes simplex virus I (HSV-I) which targeted and attacked the spinal column and brain. The virus led to a case of encephalitis which caused the brain damage of his hippocampus, resulting in his amnesia.

- Henry Molaison, formerly known as patient H.M.

Molaison had epileptic seizures and had his medial temporal lobes surgically removed to prevent or decrease the occurrence of the seizures. After the removal of Molaison's medial temporal lobes, he had anterograde amnesia as well as moderate retrograde amnesia. Molaison was still able to retain procedural memory after the surgery.

- KC (patient)

"The extent of damage to K.C.'s medial temporal lobes, particularly to his hippocampus and parahippocampal gyrus, and associated diencephalic and basal forebrain structures, is in line with his profound impairment on all explicit tests of new learning and memory. There is some uncertainty as to whether this pattern of neurological damage also accounts for his severe remote autobiographical memory loss while sparing his remote spatial memory."

- Lev Zasetsky

Zasetsky was a patient who was treated by Russian neuropsychologist Alexander Luria

== Aging ==
Normal aging, although not responsible for causing memory disorders, is associated with a decline in cognitive and neural systems including memory (long-term and working memory). Many factors such as genetics and neural degeneration have a part in causing memory disorders. In order to diagnose Alzheimer's disease and dementia early, researchers are trying to find biological markers that can predict these diseases in younger adults. One such marker is a beta-amyloid deposit which is a protein that deposits on the brain as we age. Although 20-33% of healthy elderly adults have these deposits, they are increased in elderly with diagnosed Alzheimer's disease and dementia.

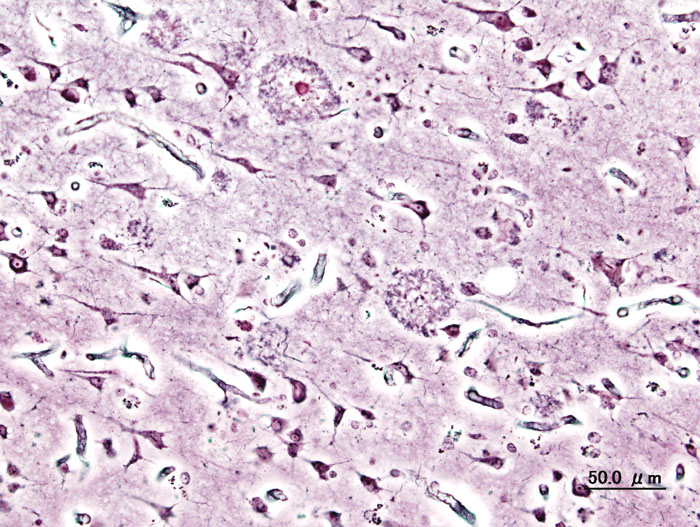
Amyloid plaques associated with Alzheimer's disease that increase in number with age

Additionally, traumatic brain injury, TBI, is increasingly being linked as a factor in early-onset Alzheimer's disease.

The National Health and Nutrition Examination Survey (NHANES) administered the word learning and recall modules from the Consortium to Establish a Registry for Alzheimer's disease (CERAD) to over three thousand participants 60 years and older in 2011–2014. Trained interviewers administered the test at the end of a face-to-face private interview in an examination center. An extensive analysis of these data has been published. Delayed recall scores (median, 25th percentile, 75th percentile) declined with age: 60-69y: 6.4, 4.9, 7.8; 70-79y: 5.5, 3.9, 7.0; 80+y: 4.1, 2.4, 5.8.

One study examined dementia severity in elderly schizophrenic patients diagnosed with Alzheimer's disease and dementia versus elderly schizophrenic patients without any neurodegenerative disorders. In most cases, if schizophrenia is diagnosed, Alzheimer's disease or some form of dementia in varying levels of severity is also diagnosed. It was found that increased hippocampal neurofibrillary tangles and higher amyloid plaque density (in the superior temporal gyrus, orbitofrontal gyrus, and the inferior parietal cortex) were associated with increased severity of dementia. Along with these biological factors, when the patient also had the apolipoprotein E (ApoE4) allele (a known genetic risk factor for Alzheimer's disease), the amyloid plaques increased although the hippocampal neurofibrillary tangles did not. It showed an increased genetic susceptibility to more severe dementia with Alzheimer's disease than without the genetic marker.

As seen in the examples above, although memory does degenerate with age, it is not always classified as a memory disorder. The difference in memory between normal aging and a memory disorder is the amount of beta-amyloid deposits, hippocampal neurofibrillary tangles, or amyloid plaques in the cortex. If there is an increased amount, memory connections become blocked, memory functions decrease much more than what is normal for that age and a memory disorder is diagnosed.

The cholinergic hypothesis of geriatric memory dysfunction is an older hypothesis that was considered before beta-amyloid deposits, neurofibrillary tangles, or amyloid plaques. It states that by blocking the cholinergic mechanisms in control subjects you can examine the relationship between cholinergic dysfunction and normal aging and memory disorders because this system when dysfunctional creates memory deficits.

== Cultural perspectives ==
The pervasiveness of mental health illnesses can be illustrated by looking at the size of the Diagnostic and Statistical Manual IV-TR (DSM IV-TR). Epidemiological studies have shown an increase in mental health cases globally. In 2050, there could be a pandemic of neurological diseases. An aging baby-boom population increases the demand for mental health care.

Western culture's gauge of mental illness is determinate on level of dangerousness, competence, and responsibility. This has led to many individuals being denied jobs, less likely to be able to rent apartments, and more likely to have false criminal charges pressed against them. The level of services available to an ever aging and memory-impaired demographic will need to increase in spite of the stigma against mental illness.

With such a stigmatization of memory disorders, and mental illnesses in general, it can be especially hard for those providing aid for these individuals. Some individuals “are unable to acquire or retain new information, making it difficult or impossible to meet social, family and work-related obligations.” Because of this, there is a large responsibility placed on caregivers (usually children) to uphold economic and emotional upkeeps. While there are services available for this group, very few make use of them.

In Asian collectivist cultures, focus lies on the social interactions between members of society. Every individual in the society has a certain role to fulfill, and it is deemed socially acceptable to uphold these roles. Furthermore, there is a focus on a balance of body, mind, and spirit. As a result, there is a large discrepancy between what should be deemed acceptable treatments for memory disorders that focus on interpersonal relationships and adjustments to others' expectations rather than a Western-led treatment schedule.. In these Asian cultures, mental illness is believed to be the result of an imbalance of hot-cold/wet-dry which interferes with the proper functioning of the nerves, heart, liver, lungs, kidneys, and spleen. Such an imbalance can sometimes been seen as a point of beauty as "one is the recipient of others' concern and sympathy."

== In popular culture ==
Characters with memory disorders have helped to move literature and media along by allowing for suspense to be created either through retrograde or traumatic amnesia as seen in Alfred Hitchcock's Spellbound. It can also provide comic relief if a character is introduced who has short-term memory impairments.

Some examples from film and television that depict characters with memory disorders include:

- Denny Crane, a character from the television show Boston Legal, shows cognitive impairment that could be indicative to Alzheimer's disease.
- Dr. Philip Brainard, a character in the movie The Absent-Minded Professor, displays mild memory impairment.
- The character Dory, from the movie Finding Nemo, shows severe short-term memory loss.
- Actor Michael J. Fox was diagnosed with Parkinson's disease in 1991, which caused memory loss over time.
- In the film Memento, the main character, Leonard Shelby, has a short-term memory condition (anterograde amnesia) in which he cannot form new memories.
- The character Savant, a member of the DC Comics superhero team the Birds of Prey, exhibits both photographic and non-linear memory as a result of what is described only as "a chemical imbalance".
- Iris Murdoch, the British writer and philosopher, developed Alzheimer's disease. She was portrayed by Kate Winslet in the film Iris in 2001.
- In The Notebook (2004), the film based on the novel by Nicholas Sparks (1996), the character Allie Hamilton (played by Rachel McAdams) developed Alzheimer's disease.
- In the video game Firewatch, the main character's wife is diagnosed with early-onset Alzheimer's disease at the beginning of the game.
- In the Peter Pan stories by J. M. Barrie, Peter is very immature and lacks the capacity to form mental representations. Because of this he is amnesic. He is unable to form episodic memories though he has acquired certain skills such as steering a boat. He knows certain facts including facts about himself but does not how he comes to know these facts. He has difficulty recognising people but knows that they are familiar to him. He has some memory of emotions and desires.
- Remy "Thirteen" Hadley from House starts showing early signs of Huntington's disease and takes the test for it in the fourth season finale.

== See also ==
- Central nervous system
- Neuroimaging
