= Heterotopagnosia =

Inability to locate another person's body parts

Heterotopagnosia is a neuro-psychological syndrome caused by brain damage in the left parietal lobe and corresponding to an acquired inability in pointing at and locating another person's body parts. Its name comes from the Greek: "hetero" which means the other from a pair, "a" combined with "gnosis" which means without knowledge, and "topos" which means location. This clinical syndrome is distinct from autotopagnosia, another group of cognitive deficits associated with difficulties in locating body parts on one's own body. Allotopagnosia is another related disorder in which the patient cannot point at any external targets except his/her own body parts.

== Causes ==
Heterotopagnosia is a type of brain damage that affects the left parietal lobe, at the parieto-occipital junction, or in the inferior parietal lobe. The brain damage could be an ischemic or an hemorrhagic stroke, or a neurogenerative disorder affecting this region.

== Symptoms ==
Heterotopagnosia is an inability in pointing at another person's body parts associated with a spared ability in pointing one's own body parts. When the patient is asked by the examiner to point at his/her own body parts, he/she shows normal performance. However, when asked to point at the examiner's body parts, the patient erroneously points at his/her own corresponding body parts. For example, when the patient is asked "Point at the examiner's nose", the patient points at his/her own nose (so-called "self-referencing" behavior). In typical cases, the patient can point at objects, even those located on the body of other persons. In three reported observations of patients with heterotopagnosia, the ability in touching or grasping other person's body parts was spared.

== Diagnosis ==
=== Clinical examination ===
Heterotopagnosia can be detected by asking several questions: “Point to your nose”: the patient shows no error. “Point to my nose”: the patient erroneously points to his/her own nose. “Point to the door, to the ceiling, to my glasses…”: typically, the patient shows no errors for objects. “What is it called?” (the examiner points to his/her own nose”: the patient can name the nose of the examiner or any object.

=== Core syndrome ===
Based on the different cases reported in the literature, the core syndrome of heterotopagnosia appears to imply: 1) an impaired capacity in pointing at another person's body parts; 2) a spared capacity in pointing at the patient's body parts; 3) a self-referencing behavior is observed when the patient fails to point at another person's body parts (except in the case).

=== Brain imaging ===
Brain imaging (CT-scan or MRI or functional imaging) demonstrates a damage to the left posterior parietal, the left parieto-occipital or the inferior parietal region. According to Cleret de Langavant et al., an additional lesion in the insular region makes the syndrome of heterotopagnosia long-lasting.

== Clinical cases ==
Sixteen patients with heterotopagnosia have been reported so far in the literature. Those patients all share the striking inability in pointing at another person's body parts, despite normal performance for pointing at their own body. All patients but one show the self-referencing behavior. Despite similarities between the clinical assessments in those sixteen patients, the same tests were not proposed in all patients, yielding discrepancies in the descriptions of impairments. For example, grasping capacities were only tested in four patients and touching in one patient.

=== Degos et al. (1997) / Degos and Bachoud-Lévi (1998) ===
JD Degos and AC Bachoud-Lévi described for the first time the syndrome of heterotopagnosia in nine patients after a left hemisphere stroke. In 5 of these patients, the deficit was restricted to the body of other persons (pure heterotopagnosia), while for the 4 other patients, the inability to point at external targets included both other persons' body and objects (allotopagnosia). Three patients with heterotopagnosia could perfectly point at body parts of pictures of human body and another patient with heterotopagnosia could point at body parts of a doll. The authors described for the first time the self-referencing behavior typical in heterotopagnosia and allotopagnosia, by which patients point at their own body instead of pointing at another person's one. One patient with heterotopagnosia had better performance for grasping other person's body parts than for pointing at them. Another patient with heterotopagnosia recovered from this disorder after eight days and offered a narrative of his experience: he could see the body parts of other persons but could not locate them, and acknowledged confusing between the body of other persons and his own. The authors interpreted this disorder as an impairment in the process of pointing itself.

=== Felician et al. (2003) ===
O Felician and collaborators described two patients showing a typical double dissociation. The first patient suffered from autotopagnosia, with a selective deficit in pointing to own body parts and a spared ability to point to the body parts of others. The second patient demonstrated symptoms of pure heterotopagnosia, with a selective inability to point to another person's body parts, a self-referencing behavior, and a spared capacity to point to own body. The patient with heterotopagnosia could point at objects whether at a reaching distance, in the room or on the examiner's body. The patients could point at parts of animals or of complex objects. This patient could point at body parts of a picture of a human body, at parts of a mask, whether held by the examiner or onto the examiner's face, or at parts of a face visible onto a TV screen, whether still or moving. The patient with heterotopagnosia had decreased brain perfusion in the left inferior parietal lobe, while the patient with autotopagnosia had decreased perfusion in the left superior parietal lobe.

=== Auclair et al. (2008) ===
L Auclair and collaborators described the case of a patient with heterotopagnosia, with impaired pointing performance for other persons’ body parts but also for other human body representations. A qualitative analysis of pointing errors showed that the patient did not exhibit a self-referencing behavior. Brain imaging identified a left parieto-occipital hemorrhagic stroke.

=== Cleret de Langavant et al. (2009) ===
L Cleret de Langavant and collaborators described three patients with long-lasting heterotopagnosia, in contrast with most patients with this syndrome that rapidly recover after few hours or days. The three patients had typical heterotopagnosia, with severe impairment for pointing at other person's body parts, especially the body of the examiner (“point to my nose”), but also for a third person (“point to his nose”). Patients showed better performance when pointing at non-living representations of humans (dolls, pictures, drawings) or at objects. In one patient, pointing performance improved when he was instructed to consider the target person as a doll. In the three patients, grasping other person's body (or touching for one patient) was by far easier than pointing at another person's body parts. All three patients had a left posterior parietal lesion and a lesion in the insula, either left or right. The authors suggested that the left posterior parietal lesion was necessary to occur to observe heterotopagnosia, but that the associated insular lesion was the reason for the long-lasting effect of the parietal lesion.

=== Cleret de Langavant et al. (2016) ===
L Cleret de Langavant and collaborators reported the unusual case of a female patient with primary progressive aphasia of the logopenic type and with heterotopagnosia who was more accurate in pointing to men's body parts than to women's body parts. She exhibited the self-referencing behavior and better pointed at objects than at other person's body parts. She also better grasped women's body parts than she could point at them. Brain MRI showed atrophy of the left parietal region and of the left frontal cortex.

=== Bassolino et al. (2019) ===
M Basolino and collaborators studied the case of a patient with heterotopagnosia and self-referencing behavior after a left parieto-occipital hemorrhagic stroke due to a cerebral arterioveinous malformation which was surgically treated. This patient showed deficits in pointing at another person's body parts, but also at body parts on a drawing of human body, on a doll and on a picture of a human body. The patient could locate the body parts of three different animals without errors. The authors used a virtual reality setting in order to test the respective influence of somatosensory and visual inputs in the disorder of this patient.

== Interpretations ==
Considering the clinical description of their cases, the different authors attempted to provide an interpretation of the complex behavior of patients with heterotopagnosia, which remains debated.

=== An objectivization disorder? ===
According to Degos and collaborators, accurate pointing requires two complementary representations at cognitive levels: 1) an egocentric visuo-proprioceptive representation which extends somato-sensori inputs from the subject's body to the visual inputs from the extrapersonal space; 2) an objective representation by which the target of pointing is singled out from the first visuo-proprioceptive continuum. The body of other persons would be easily matched to the subject's body through brain mechanisms such as mirror neurons and thus more difficult to single out in the objective representation, yielding heterotopagnosia.

=== A category-specific disorder affecting human body-specific visuospatial representations? ===
Felician and collaborators argue that pointing to body parts is a category-specific behavior that relies on both somatosensory representations and body-specific visual representations. In case of damage of somatosensory representations, autotopagnosia could be observed, while in case of body-specific visual representations, it would be heterotopagnosia.

=== An impairment of self-other distinction and spatial coding of human body parts? ===
Auclair and collaborators acknowledge the role of the left parietal region for human body parts representations, and suggest that this region could participate in the distinction between self and other's body.

=== A difficulty in viewing another person’s body as an object? ===
Cleret de Langavant and collaborators recalled that pointing is a communicative gesture that necessarily involves a first person who points, a second person to whom the pointing gesture is addressed, and an object, the target of the pointing gesture. Within this triadic setting, only the first two are truly persons while the object or third person is essentially a non-person. According to these authors, two spatial reference frames (or representations) should exist for any pointing gesture: an egocentric representation that accounts for the first person's perspective and a heterocentric representation that accounts for the second person's perspective (the egocentric space from the addressee's perspective). Heterotopagnosia would arise from the inabily to conceive at the same time another humain as an addresse, with a heterocentric perspective, and as an object, deprived from this heterocentric perspective. They summarize heterotopagnosia as an inability to view another person's body as an object.

=== An inability to integrate self-related somatosensory information with others’ body visual information? ===
Bassolino and collaborators used virtual reality to test the respective role of identity of the human body (self versus other) and of the perspective onto that body (first person perspective versus third person perspective) in heterotopagnosia. They proposed that heterotopagnosia could stem from a difficulty in the integration of self-related somatosensory signals with other-body-related visual information.
