= Lev Zasetsky =

Soviet brain injury survivor (1920–1993)

- Born: 9 August 1920
- Died: 9 September 1993 (aged 73)

Lev Alexandrovich Zasetsky (9 August 1920 – 9 September 1993) was a patient who was treated by Soviet neuropsychologist Alexander Luria. Zasetsky suffered a severe brain injury, losing his ability to read, write, and speak (retrieving desired words was particularly difficult), and suffering impaired vision, memory, and other functions. He was notable for the tenacity (and to some extent, success) with which he fought to regain a normal life, and for what the pattern of his deficits helped cognitive scientists to learn about brain function. He also wrote a journal of his experience, which itself was extraordinarily difficult for him.

He was 23 years old when injured in the Battle of Smolensk on March 2, 1943. A bullet entered his left parieto-occipital area, and resulted in a long coma. Following this he developed a form of agnosia and became unable to perceive the right side of things. Objects he did see often appeared as fragmented pieces rather than whole objects. Even the right side of his own body was invisible to him, an experience that remained terrifying even years later. Luria, who treated Zasetsky over the course of 26 years, published excerpts from Zasetsky's journal and a detailed case history in The Man with a Shattered World: The History of a Brain Wound. Zasetsky died in September 1993 at the age of 73.

== See also ==
- Solomon Shereshevskii
- Phineas Gage
