= Autotopagnosia =

Form of agnosia

Autotopagnosia from the Greek a and gnosis, meaning "without knowledge", topos meaning "place", and auto meaning "oneself", autotopagnosia virtually translates to the "lack of knowledge about one's own space," and is clinically described as such.

Autotopagnosia is a form of agnosia, characterized by an inability to localize and orient different parts of the body. The psychoneurological disorder has also been referred to as "body-image agnosia" or "somatotopagnosia." Somatotopagnosia has been argued to be a better suited term to describe the condition. While autotopagnosia emphasizes the deficiencies in localizing only one's own body parts and orientation, somatotopagnosia also considers the inability to orient and recognize the body parts of others or representations of the body (e.g., manikins, diagrams).

Typically, the cause of autotopagnosia is a lesion found in the parietal lobe of the left hemisphere of the brain. However, it as also been noted that patients with generalized brain damage present with similar symptoms of autotopagnosia. As a concept, autotopagnosia has been criticized as nonspecific; some claim that this is a manifestation of a greater symptomatic complex of anomia, marked by an inability to name things in general—not just parts of the human body.

== Symptoms and signs ==
Contiguity errors, the most common errors made by patients with autotopagnosia, refer to errors made when the patient is asked to locate a certain body part and points to the surrounding body parts, but not the part they've been asked to locate.

Semantic errors refer to errors made when patients point to body parts in the same category as that which they've been asked to locate, but cannot locate the correct body part. An example of a semantic error would be a patient pointing to an elbow when asked to locate a knee. Semantic errors are much less common than contiguity errors.

Some patients demonstrating the symptoms of autotopagnosia have a decreased ability to locate parts of other multipart object. Patients are considered to have "pure" autotopagnosia, however, if their deficiency is specific to body part localization. Patients with "pure" autotopagnosia often have no problems carrying out tasks involved in everyday life that require body part awareness. Patients have difficulty locating body parts when directly asked, but can carry out activities such as putting on pants without difficulty. Patients can describe the function and appearance of body parts, yet they are still unable to locate them.

Damage to the left parietal lobe can result in what is called Gerstmann syndrome. It can include right-left confusion, a difficulty with writing Agraphia and a difficulty with mathematics Acalculia. In addition, it can also produce language deficiencies Aphasia and an inability to recognize objects normally Agnosia.

Other related disorders include:

- Apraxia: an inability to perform skilled movements despite understanding of the movements and intact sensory and motor systems.
- Finger agnosia: An inability to name the fingers, move a specific finger upon being asked, and/or recognize which finger has been touched when an examiner touches one.

== Causes ==
Due to the subjective nature of autotopagnosia, there are many hypotheses presented as to the underlying causation. Since the condition by definition is an inability to recognize the human body and its parts, the disorder could stem from a language deficit specific to body parts. On the other hand, the patient could have a disrupted body image or a variation of the inability to separate parts from whole. It is also believed that autotopagnosia has multiple underlying causes that cannot be categorized as either language-specific or body-image-specific. The rarity of autotopagnosia, frequently combined with the manifestation of other psychoneurological disorders, makes the prime cause extremely difficult to study. In many cases, one of these accompanying conditions—often aphasia—could be masking the patient's autotopagnosia altogether.

=== Brain Lesions ===
Animation highlighting the parietal lobe of the left cerebral hemisphere

Although it is still unclear what precise deficits in brain function cause the symptoms of autotopagnosia, the location of brain damage is not as ambiguous. Autotopagnosia is most often attributed to lesions in the parietal lobe of the left hemisphere of the brain. However, it is also believed that the disorder can be caused by general brain damage as well. Many different types of brain lesions can cause autotopagnosia; however, neoplastic lesions seem to be the most common. "Pure" autotopagnosia is often seen with smaller lesions, as larger lesions tend to create other unseen deficits that can confuse or mask the appearance of the symptoms of autotopagnosia—such as aphasia, as discussed above.

=== Mental Representations of Body Schema ===
Lesions in the left parietal lobe are thought to disrupt one or more of four putative mental representations of body schema. The deficiencies associated with the disease seem to arise from a dysfunction in the mental representation of the body; however, the human psyche interprets its body schema and orientation in space through various sources of representation systems. According to Felician et al. (2003), the notion of body schema can be categorized into four tiers of mental representation:

Level	Type	Description
1	Lexical and Semantic Representations of the Body	At the first level, the mind anchors its body image to refer to body-related conceptual knowledge, associated with speech and language recognition. For instance, the identification of body parts are attributed to fundamental knowledge of the names and titles, rather than the physical locations and relationships of body parts.
2	Category-specific Visuospatial Representations of the Body	On the second tier, unlike semantic representation, the visuospatial schema specifies the structural position of parts over the body surface. In particular, it relates to the local relationship between body parts and the boundaries between them.
3	Classical Notion of Postural Schema	On a third level, the classical notion of postural schema emerges, which draws from various sources of sensory afferences. Information from proprioceptive, tactile, visual, auditory, and vestibular systems is consolidated to construct an on-line, three-dimensional and dynamic representation of the body in space, a "somatosensory representation."
4	Motor Representations	Finally, the skeletal-muscular system provides motor representations that participate in the formation and preservation of the somatosensory representations.

== Diagnosis ==
The nature of the alleged mental representations that underlie the act of pointing to target body parts have been a controversial issue. Originally, it was diagnosed as the effects of general mental deterioration or of aphasia on the task of pointing to body parts on verbal command. However, contemporary neuropsychological therapy seeks to establish the independence of autotopagnosia from other disorders. With such a general definition, a patient that presents with a dysfunction of or failure in accessing one of four mental representation systems has autotopagnosia. Through observational testing, the type of mental misrepresentation of the body can be deduced: whether semantic, visuospatial, somatosensory, or motor misrepresentations. Neuropsychological tests can provide a proper diagnosis in regards to the specificity of patient's agnosic condition.

1) Test 1: Body Part Localization: Free vision and no vision conditions

This exploratory approach assesses the patient's ability to localize one's body parts and those of the examiner in several different conditions. The examiner and subjects are seated facing one another at a one-meter distance. At the start of each trial, the examiner ensures that the subject's hands are at rest on the arms of the chair and legs uncrossed. In addition, errors are categorized as (1) left-right reversal: response to correct part on incorrect side; (2) spatial: response to area contiguous with target; (3) functional/semantic: response to area non-contiguous with target, but sharing function or a part of a larger unit; (4) unrelated to examiner's request.

Test 1	Specifications	Description
A	Verbal Command: Point to Self	Examiner names a body part, and the subjects are instructed to point to that part on themselves.
B	Verbal Command: Point to Examiner	Examiner names a body part, and subjects are instructed to point to that named part on the examiner.
C	Visual Cue: Point to Self	Examiner points to body parts on himself, and subjects are required to point to the homologous part on themselves.
D	Visual Cue: Point to Examiner	Examiner points to a body part on the subjects, and they are required to point to the homologous part on the examiner.
E	Blindfold Post-Visual Cue: Point to Self	Same as Study 1c., except subjects are blindfolded after examiner points to himself, prior to response execution.

2) Test 2: On-line positioning of body vis-à-vis objects

If deficits in body part localization are due to impairments in body schema, then patients should be deficient in reaching and grasping objects. This test evaluates the specificity of the patient's insufficiency, in regards to the specific positioning of body parts with respect to objects.

3) Test 3: Localization of objects on the body surface

Patients were asked to point to small objects mounted on the body, acting as a body reference system (body schema). The investigation is to determine whether localization of the same points on the body surfaces assessed in Test 1 might be improved when these points correspond to external objects.

4) Test 4: Body part semantic knowledge

Patient is shown photographs of 10 items of clothing and 7 grooming tools, 1 per trial, and asked to point to the part of his own body associated with each item.

5) Test 5: Matching body parts: Effect of viewing angle

Assessment of whether the patient's deficit in body part representation extends to individual body parts, and whether visual attributes of the body and its parts, such as viewing angle, affect their recognition.

== Treatment ==
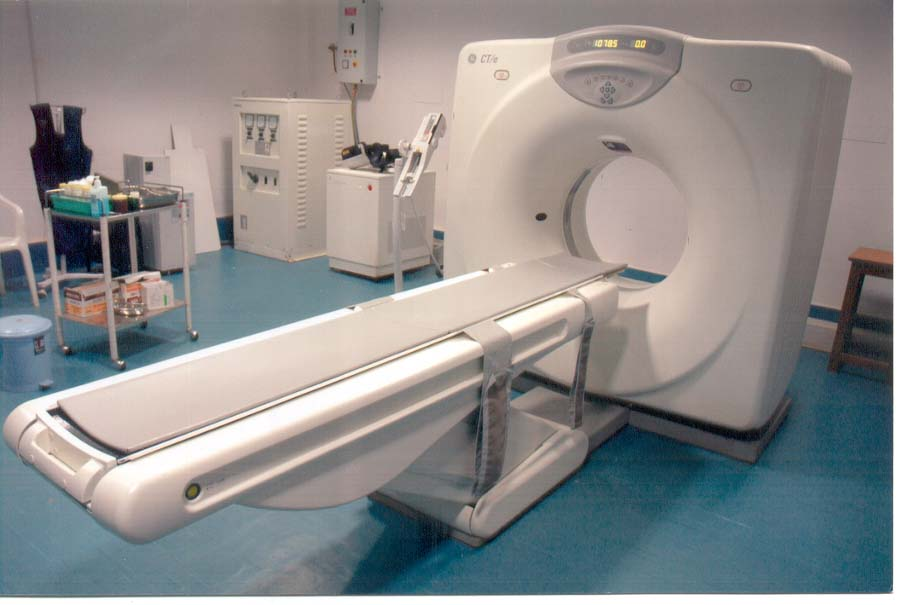
A CT scanner

As autotopagnosia arises from neurological and irreversible damage, options regarding symptom reversal or control are limited. As of April 2010, there are no known specific treatments for autotopagnosia.

No medications or pharmaceutical remedies have been approved by the U.S. Food and Drug Administration to treat or cure autotopagnosia. There have been cases in which extensive rehabilitation has been beneficial following restitution, repetitive training to correct the impaired function, and compensation of other skills to make up for the deficit. Rehabilitation is not a definitive treatment and only shows signs of slight improvement in a small percentage of autotopagnosia patients.

== History ==
Head and Holme's studies (1911) were developed alongside those of Arnold Pick (1851–1924), who was the first to describe autotopagnosia (1908) as the inability to locate body parts on command on a whole body structure. Pick noted those with autotopagnosia as having a dissociation between the capacity to recognize and name their own body part (as commanded by an examiner) and the inability to find the same body part on command. In a series of studies, Pick focused on patients who were unable to point to their own body parts and those of the examiner. His patients could however comprehend the body part terminology as well as locate them on a painted visual; however none had a clear demonstration of body specificity. Pick concluded a disturbance of "visual" body image and body awareness. Pick's studies introduced autotopagnosia and other category specific agnosias, such as visual and tactile agnosia. Josef Gerstmann (1887–1969) first developed the term somatotopagnosia, meaning the lack of knowledge about the body space. Gerstmann studied patients whose deficits were in the body schema and thus lacked the ability to recognize, identify or name the fingers on either hand, a phenomenon known as finger agnosia.

Until the 1980s, there had been no scientifically accredited cases of autotopagnosia, rather agnosias that have been secondary to other neurological deficits such as dementia. In fact the term autotopagnosia does not appear until Pick's studies in 1908 and 1922.

== See also ==
- Allochiria
