= Integrative agnosia =

- The highlighted region of the brain indicates the extrastriate cortex, which, when damaged, may lead to integrative agnosia.

Integrative agnosia is a sub-type of agnosia, meaning the lack of integrating perceptual wholes within knowledge. Integrative agnosia can be assessed by several experimental tests such as the Efron shape test, which determines the specificity of the condition being Integrative. This condition is often caused by brain trauma, producing medial ventral lesions to the extrastriate cortex. Affecting this region of the brain produces learning impairments: the inability to integrate parts such as spatial distances or producing visual images from short or long-term memory.

== Symptoms and signs ==
Symptoms generally include memory or learning impairments, with the inability to integrate parts coherently. There is a large range in the severity of integrative agnosia and the symptoms that patients experience often vary.

== Causes ==
Possible causes of integrative agnosia include stroke, traumatic brain injury, Alzheimer's disease, an anoxic episode following myocardial infarction, and progressive multifocal leukoencephalopathy.

== Diagnosis ==
Cases of integrative agnosia often appear to have medial ventral lesions in the extrastriate cortex. Those who have integrative agnosia are better able to identify inanimate than animate items, which indicates processes that lead to accurate perceptual organization of visual information can be impaired. This is attributed to the importance of perceptual updating of stored visual knowledge, which is particularly important for classes of stimuli that have many perceptual neighbors and/or stimuli for which perceptual features are central to their stored representations. Patients also show a tendency to process visual stimuli initially at a global rather than local level. Although the grouping of local elements into perceptual wholes can be impaired, patients can remain sensitive to holistic visual representations.

When determining whether a patient has form agnosia or integrative agnosia, an Efron shape test can be performed. A poor score on the Efron shape test will indicate form agnosia, as opposed to integrative agnosia. A good score on the Efron shape test, but a poor score on a figure-ground segmentation test and an overlapping figures test will indicate integrative agnosia. A patient with integrative agnosia will find it hard to group and segment shapes, especially if there are overlapping animate items or they can over segment objects with high internal detail. However, the patient should have and understand basic coding of shape.

== Treatment ==
One treatment thought to be effective is the repeated exposure to a particular face or object, where impaired perception may be reorganized in memory, leading to improvement on tests of imagery relative to tests of perception. The key factor for this type of treatment to be successful is a regular and consistent exposure, which will lead to improvements in the long run. Results may not be seen right away, but are eventually possible.

== Research ==
=== Case study 1 ===
A case study on a patient named H.J.A. is discussed and analyzed by M. Jane Riddoch and Glyn W Humphreys. Because this case study is done specifically on the experiences of one person diagnosed with integrative agnosia, generalizations about the condition as a whole or the individuals with it cannot be made based these results alone.

Like many people who are diagnosed with integrative agnosia, H.J.A. was diagnosed after suffering a stroke during a surgical procedure in an operating room. The patient underwent several experiments to verify the specific type of agnosia. H.J.A. showed top half visual deficits of the entire visual field in both right and left eyes. Lower visual fields showed normal patterns to the stimulus.

Through the first experiment, the patient showed that tactile presentation of an object helped H.J.A. significantly in identifying an object. When the object was presented only visually, the patient struggled and showed difficulty. Objects used were common everyday objects. The patient always used descriptive terminology to identify an object instead of a single word or term. However, H.J.A. showed an ability to copy objects and match two objects, both pictures and physical objects.

The second experiment showed that H.J.A. was able to identify figures better when presented the silhouette. Other patients with integrative agnosia also tend to show this symptom. The patient lacks local information of the figures to support the global information, which explains the lack of confidence in naming the object. H.J.A. also shows trouble discriminating figures that are significant and others that are meaningless stimuli. This, in turn, can explain why the patient cannot distinguish overlapping figures.

The third experiment showed that the patient was able to give important information about an object, even though, previously, could not identify the object visually. The memory of the patient is intact despite visual deficits. In the fourth and final section of experiments, the patient shows a lack of visual color knowledge, but structures of a given specific object is not impaired, as H.J.A. uses the technique of drawing from memories. This shows that the patient's visual perceptions and memories containing prior knowledge are not altered by integrative agnosia following the stroke.

=== Case study 2 ===
In a second case study also performed by the M. Jane Riddoch and Glyn W. Humphreys, H.J.A was the subject in this case study to determine the effects integrative agnosia has on visual and spatial short-term memory.

In the first group of experiments, Riddoch and Humphreys tested the patient's visual, spatial, and perceptual capabilities. They first asked him draw his bedroom using his visual capabilities, comparing it to his drawing from memory, rather than visual, at a specific date. They repeated this test again one year later. His results showed that patients with integrative agnosia have problems in accurately recalling spatial information from long-term memory. In addition, H.J.A was asked to assess spatial locations of cities he was familiar with before his stroke. The evidence of his inability to assess the spatial distances supported the correct diagnosis of integrative agnosia.

When H.J.A was asked to compare images of human faces, he was able to point out specific facial features. However, when asked to make side-by-side comparisons of several celebrities' faces, he was unable to make the same comparisons a person without integrative agnosia are able to by integrating features into a perceptual representation. On the other hand, the patient did well when asked to determine the angle degrees of the hands of a clock. But because the patient had to simply make a global judgment based on the hands of the clock, there were not any judgments made based on the perception of local parts, such as the comparison of features of a face for example.

In the second group of experiments, the patient, H.J.A, was tested on his ability to manipulate images, assess information using his spatial memory, and complete pattern tasks.
The patient performed a series of tasks such as the Moscovitch Letter Manipulation Task, the Brooks Matrix Task, and a Compass Directions Task. The patient proved able to receive the spatial material well with short-term memory when manipulating materials without a reference frame. The patient was still able to make global processes, identify shapes, single lines, and letters, but lacked the ability to process configurations in perceptual representations, in the respective tasks. When visually holding an image for 10 seconds, the patient was able to process a spatial pattern and transfer that image onto paper accurately. The tasks that H.J.A were given showed where the parts specifically failed to integrate: the patent's perception on spatial elements without a point of reference. With a reference point, H.J.A is able to integrate the parts.

In the last set of experiments, H.J.A is being tested on his ability to reproduce a visual stimuli and reproduce possible and impossible figures. Evidence suggested that the patient had an ability again maintain the global information in order to draw items, and reiterated his difficulty in maintaining local elements and spatial relations. The last experiment (Experiment 11) was the most difficult for H.J.A visually. He was significantly impaired in drawing the impossible figures provided and spent a significant amount of time more than the control, the elderly population, used in this experiment, processing the information to be able to transform them onto paper. The patient demonstrated a lack of representation of all local parts when reproducing the image.

It was concluded that the tasks performed well by H.J.A included the tasks involving ranges of imagery-based tasks, accurately make judgments about global representations such as the angles of a clock, maintained visual patterns over inter-stimulus intervals, mentally rotating letters, manipulating two elements of an image. In contrast, impairment was gauged to be the lack of the ability in recalling spatial layouts, judging spatial directions, judging relative positions of objects, The Brooks Matrix Test, Compass Direction Task, reproducing abstract patterns, and reproducing both possible and impossible figures. Due to the impairment, it was identified that the patient did not have intact imagery and visual short-term memory, made apparent by the spatial relations test. Due to Integrative Agnosia, the patients take information from a top-down manner, using stored knowledge to retrieve an objects perceptual properties. It is much more difficult for patients to use a bottom-up method, or perceiving through a visual stimulus, because of the inability to accurately code the patterns in the visual short-term memory.
