= Visual agnosia =

Impairment in recognition of visually presented objects

Visual agnosia is an impairment in recognition of visually presented objects. It is not due to a deficit in vision (acuity, visual field, and scanning), language, memory, or intellect. While cortical blindness results from lesions to primary visual cortex, visual agnosia is often due to damage to more anterior cortex such as the posterior occipital and/or temporal lobe(s) in the brain.^{[2]} There are two types of visual agnosia, apperceptive and associative.

Recognition of visual objects occurs at two levels. At an apperceptive level, the features of the visual information from the retina are put together to form a perceptual representation of an object. At an associative level, the meaning of an object is attached to the perceptual representation and the object is identified. If a person is unable to recognize objects due to inability to perceive the correct forms of the objects, although knowledge of the objects is intact (i.e. the person does not have anomia), they have apperceptive agnosia. If a person correctly perceives the forms and has knowledge of the objects, but cannot identify the objects, the person has associative agnosia.

== Symptoms and signs ==
While most cases of visual agnosia are seen in older adults who have experienced extensive brain damage, there are also cases of young children with less brain damage during developmental years acquiring the symptoms. Commonly, visual agnosia presents as an inability to recognize an object in the absence of other explanations, such as blindness or partial blindness, anomia, memory loss, etc. Other common manifestations of visual agnosia that are generally tested for include difficulty identifying objects that look similar in shape, difficulty with identifying line drawings of objects, and recognizing objects that are shown from less common views, such as a horse from a top-down view.

Within any given patient, a variety of symptoms can occur, and the impairment of ability is not only binary but can range in severity. For example, Patient SM is a prosopagnosic with a unilateral lesion to left extrastriate cortex due to an accident in his twenties who displays behavior similar to congenital prosopagnosia. Although he can recognize facial features and emotions – indeed he sometimes uses a standout feature to recognize a face – face recognition is almost impossible purely from visual stimuli, even for faces of friends, family, and himself. The disorder also affects his memory of faces, both in storing new memories of faces and recalling stored memories.

The symptoms reach to other domains. SM's object recognition is similarly impaired though not entirely; when given line drawings to identify, he was able to give names of objects with properties similar to the drawing, implying that he is able to see the features of the drawing. Similarly, copying a line drawing of a beach scene led to a simplified version of the drawing, though the main features were accounted for. For recognition of places, he is still impaired but familiar places are remembered and new places can be stored into memory.

== Pathophysiology ==
Visual agnosia occurs after damage to visual association cortex or to parts of the ventral stream of vision, known as the "what pathway" of vision for its role in object recognition. This occurs even when no damage has been done to the eyes or optic tract that leads visual information into the brain; in fact, visual agnosia occurs when symptoms cannot be explained by such damage. Damage to specific areas of the ventral stream impair the ability to recognize certain categories of visual information, such as the case of prosopagnosia. Patients with visual agnosia generally do not have damage to the dorsal stream of vision, known as the "where pathway" of vision because of its role determining object's position in space, allowing individuals with visual agnosia to show relatively normal visually guided behavior.

For example, patient DF had lesions to the ventral surface that gave her apperceptive agnosia. One of the tasks she was tested on required her to place a card through a thin slot that could be rotated into all orientations. As an apperceptive agnosic, it would be expected that since she cannot recognize the slot, she should not be able to correctly place the card into the slot. Indeed, when she was asked to give the direction of the slot, her responses were no better than chance. Yet, when she was asked to place the card into the slot, her success was almost to the level of the controls. This implies that in the event of a ventral stream deficit, the dorsal stream can help with processing of special information to aid movement regardless of object recognition.

More specifically, the lateral occipital complex appears to respond to many different types of objects. Prosopagnosia (inability to recognize faces) is due to damage of the fusiform face area (FFA). An area in the fusiform gyrus of the temporal lobe that has been strongly associated with a role in facial recognition. However, this area is not exclusive to faces; recognition of other objects of expertise are also processed in this area. The extrastriate body cortex (EBA) was found to be activated by photographs, silhouettes, or stick drawings of human bodies. The parahippocampal place area (PPA) of the limbic cortex has been found to be activated by the sight of scenes and backgrounds. Cerebral achromatopsia (the inability to discriminate between different hues) is caused by damage to the V8 area of the visual association cortex.

The left hemisphere seems to play a critical role in recognizing the meaning of common objects.

== Diagnosis ==
=== Classification ===
Broadly, visual agnosia is divided into apperceptive and associative visual agnosia.

Apperceptive agnosia is failure of object recognition even when the basic visual functions (acuity, color, motion) and other mental processing, such as language and intelligence, are normal. The brain must correctly integrate features such as edges, light intensity, and color from sensory information to form a complete percept of an object. If a failure occurs during this process, a percept of an object is not fully formed and thus it cannot be recognized. Tasks requiring copying, matching, or drawing simple figures can distinguish the individuals with apperceptive agnosia because they cannot perform such tasks.

Associative agnosia is an inability to identify objects even with apparent perception and knowledge of them. It involves a higher level of processing than apperceptive agnosia. Individuals with associative agnosia can copy or match simple figures, indicating that they can perceive objects correctly. They also display the knowledge of objects when tested with tactile or verbal information. However, when tested visually, they cannot name or describe common objects. This means that there is an impairment in associating the perception of objects with the stored knowledge of them.

Although visual agnosia can be general, there exist many variants that impair recognition of specific types. These variants of visual agnosia include prosopagnosia (inability to recognize faces), pure word blindness (inability to recognize words, often called "agnosic alexia" or "pure alexia"), agnosias for colors (inability to differentiate colors), agnosias for the environment (inability to recognize landmarks or difficulty with spatial layout of an environment, i.e. topographagnosia) and simultanagnosia (inability to sort out multiple objects in a visual scene).

==== Categories and subtypes of visual agnosia ====
The two main categories of visual agnosia are:

- Apperceptive visual agnosia, impaired object recognition. Individuals with apperceptive visual agnosia cannot form a whole percept of visual information.
- Associative visual agnosia, impaired object identification. Individuals with associative agnosia cannot give a meaning to a formed percept. The percept is created, but it would have no meaning for individuals who have an associative agnosia.

===== Subtypes of associative visual agnosia =====
- Achromatopsia, an inability to distinguish different colors.
- Prosopagnosia, an inability to recognize human faces. Individuals with prosopagnosia know that they are looking at faces, but cannot recognize people by the sight of their face, even people whom they know well.
- Simultagnosia, an inability to recognize multiple objects in a scene, including distinct objects within a spatial layout and distinguishing between "local" objects and "global" objects, such as being able to see a tree but not the forest or vice versa.
- Topographagnosia, an inability to process the spatial layout of an environment, including landmark agnosia, difficulty recognizing buildings and places; difficulty building mental maps of a location or scene; and/or an inability to discern the orientation between objects in space.
- Pure alexia, an inability to read.
- Orientation agnosia: an inability to judge or determine orientation of objects.
- Pantomime agnosia: an inability to understand pantomimes (gestures). It appears that the inferior cortical visual cortex is critical in recognizing pantomimes.

== Patient CK ==
=== Background ===
Patient C.K. was born in 1961 in England and emigrated to Canada in 1980. In January 1988, C.K. sustained a head injury from a motor vehicle accident while out for a jog. Following the accident, C.K. experienced many cognitive issues, mood swings, poor memory, and temper outbursts. C.K. also had motor weakness on the left side and a left homonymous hemianopia. He recovered well, retaining normal intelligence and normal visual acuity. He was able to complete a master's degree in history, later working as a manager at a large corporation. Although his recovery was successful in other areas of cognition, C.K. reportedly had issues with identifying objects visually.

=== Associative visual agnosia ===
Magnetic resonance imaging (MRI) showed bilateral thinning of C.K.'s occipital lobe which resulted in associative visual agnosia. Patients that have visual agnosia are unable to identify visually presented objects. They can identify these objects through other modalities such as touch but if presented visually, they are unable to. Associative agnosic patients cannot create a detailed representation of the visual world in their brains, they can only perceive elements of whole objects. They also cannot form associations between objects or assign meaning to objects.

C.K. makes many mistakes when trying to identify objects. For example, he called an abacus "skewers on a kebab" and a badminton racquet a "fencer's mask". A dart was a "feather duster" and a protractor was mistaken for a "cockpit". Despite this impairment in visual object recognition, C.K. retained many abilities such as drawing, visual imagery, and internal imagery. As a native of England, he was tasked with drawing England, marking London and where he was born. His accurate drawing of England is just one example of his excellent drawing abilities.

As aforementioned, C.K. is able to identify parts of objects but cannot generate a whole representation. His visual imagery for object size, shape, and color remains intact. For example, when shown a picture of an animal, he can correctly answer questions such as "are the ears up or down?" and "is the tail long or short?" He can correctly identify colors, for example that the inside of a cantaloupe is orange. Finally, C.K. can generate internal images and perceive these generated objects. For example, Finke, Pinker, and Farah instructed C.K. to imagine a scenario where a 'B' is rotated 90 degrees to the left, a triangle is put below, and the line in the middle is removed. C.K. can correctly identify this object as a heart by picturing this transformation in his head.

=== Evidence for double dissociation between face and object processing ===
Patient C.K. provided evidence for a double dissociation between face processing and visual object processing. Patients with prosopagnosia have damage to the Fusiform Face Area (FFA) and are unable to recognize upright faces. C.K. has no difficulty with face processing and matches the performance of controls when tasked with identifying upright famous faces. When shown inverted faces of famous people, C.K. performs significantly worse than controls. This is because processing inverted faces involves a piecemeal strategy. C.K.'s performance is compared to patients with prosopagnosia who are impaired in face processing but perform well identifying inverted faces. This was the first evidence for a double dissociation between face and object processing suggesting a face-specific processing system.

== In popular culture ==
- A famous report on this condition is the title essay of Oliver Sacks' book, The Man Who Mistook His Wife for a Hat.
- The murder suspect in the Picket Fences episode "Strangers" supposedly had agnosia.
- The patient in the House episode "Adverse Events" had agnosia.
- In the graphic novel Preacher, the character Lorie has an extreme version of agnosia resulting from being born with a single eye. For example, she perceives Arseface, a man with severe facial deformities, as resembling a young James Dean.
- Val Kilmer's character has visual agnosia in the film At First Sight.
- In "Folie à Deux", a fifth-season episode of The X-Files, Mulder succumbs to the same belief as telemarketer Gary Lambert, that his boss Greg Pincus is a monster who disguises his true appearance by means of hypnosis. Scully, although believing this notion preposterous, suggests that what Mulder describes is analogous to an induced visual agnosia.
- The short story "Liking What You See: A Documentary" by Ted Chiang examines the cultural effects of a noninvasive medical procedure that induces a visual agnosia toward physical beauty.
- In JoJolion, Holly Joestar-Kira's mysterious brain damage manifests in an extreme form of visual agnosia, as seen when she mistakes a nurse for a shoe and tries to put her on, and eventually eating six of her own fingers after mistaking them for food.

== See also ==
- Agnosia
- Blindness
- Color agnosia
- Gestaltzerfall
- Prosopagnosia
- Riddoch syndrome
- Topographical disorientation
