= Transient epileptic amnesia =

Neurological condition

Transient epileptic amnesia (TEA) is a rare but likely underdiagnosed neurological condition which manifests as relatively brief and generally recurring episodes of amnesia caused by underlying temporal lobe epilepsy. Though descriptions of the condition are based on fewer than 100 cases published in the medical literature, and the largest single study to date included 50 people with TEA, TEA offers considerable theoretical significance as competing theories of human memory attempt to reconcile its implications.

== Symptoms ==
A person experiencing a TEA episode has very little short-term memory, so that there is profound difficulty remembering events in the past few minutes (anterograde amnesia), or of events in the hours before the onset of the attack, and even memories of important events in recent years may not be accessible during the amnestic event (retrograde amnesia). Some people report short-lived retrograde amnesia so deep that they do not recognize their home or family members, though personal identity is preserved. The amnestic attack has a sudden onset. Three-fourths of cases are reported upon awakening. In attacks that begin when an individual is fully alert, olfactory hallucinations or a "strange taste" or nausea have been reported. Somewhat less than half the cases include olfactory or gustatory hallucinations, and slightly more than a third involve motor automatisms. A quarter of attacks involve a brief period of unresponsiveness. Frequently, however, there is no warning.

During the attack the person's cognitive functions are not generally impaired; perception, communication, attention are normal for most of the duration of the event. In half the cases reported, behavior includes repetitive questioning to attempt to orient experience as the brain fails to lay down new memories or recall a range of recent experiences. The website of the UK-based organization The Impairment of Memory in Epilepsy (TIME) describes an attack this way:

During an attack, the person is usually unable to remember things that have happened over the past days or weeks. Sometimes, the memory loss may affect events from much further back in the past. Also, the individual often finds it difficult to retain new information and may ask the same question, such as "What day is it?" or "What are we supposed to be doing today?" repetitively. There is, however, no loss of personal identity, and close friends or relatives are usually recognised. The physical appearance of the person is normally unchanged. Observers may, however, notice some pallor of the skin, a brief 'loss of contact' such as not seeming to be aware of the person witnessing the attack, or some automatic movements such as swallowing, lip-smacking or fidgeting of the hands. In most cases, however, the person responds appropriately to the situation they are in. They carry on conversations and can continue with activities such as getting dressed, walking, or even playing a game of golf.

Attacks typically last 20 to 60 minutes. Some attacks may be less than five minutes in duration. Much longer attacks have been reported; in the 2007 study of 50 TEA cases, one lasted four days and one lasted two days. Such unusual presentations "may be due to ongoing seizure activity (non-convulsive status epilepticus) or persistent post-ictal dysfunction of memory-related brain structures."

As the amnesia resolves, the person may recall very little about it, although some memory may be retained of the fact of an episode. Of greater consequence than this brief gap are three common persistent memory complaints among people who have experienced TEA: difficulty recalling knowledge recently gained (accelerated forgetting); difficulty recalling events in one's personal life over a period of decades (autobiographical amnesia); and difficulty with spatial memory, recalling routes or places and the navigational cues that are associated with them (topographical amnesia), discussed below.

== Diagnosis ==
Transient amnesia can be the principal manifestation of epilepsy. This diagnosis, however, is "seldom suspected by clinicians and remains controversial". TEA is "almost always misdiagnosed" according to a leading authority. In the largest study to date (2007) "Epilepsy was the initial specialist diagnosis in only 12 of 50 cases." Diagnosis is further complicated by the fact that only somewhat more than a third of cases present positive EEG readings after the attack. However, as TEA tends to recur at a median rate of 12 times a year, witnesses and clinicians may be able to recognize the condition retrospectively; the median delay to diagnosis of TEA in the 2007 study was 12 months.

TEA is a form of focal seizure, which is "the most common variety of adult-onset epilepsy" as opposed to the stereotypical tonic-clonic or grand mal seizure in which affected persons suffer a loss of consciousness and convulse. Diagnostic criteria for the disorder were adopted in the 2007 study of 50 case emphasized clinical features that distinguish TEA from transient global amnesia (TGA), with which TEA is often compared:

- A history of recurrent witnessed episodes of transient amnesia. In some people, they are very infrequent (less than one per year) whereas others experience them as often as once a week. The episodes are usually very similar to each other.
- Cognitive functions other than memory are judged to be intact during typical episodes by a reliable witness. In addition to the complex learned behaviors cited above by the TIME organization, reports include people with TEA sight-reading music and playing piano, translating languages, driving or sailing a yacht in the open sea.
- Evidence for a diagnosis of epilepsy based on one or more of the following:
  - Epileptiform abnormalities on electroencephalography (EEG). In a survey of all known cases, 43.6% have epileptiform abnormalities localised over the temporal or frontotemporal region on electroencephalography following the attack. Of these, 31.7% were left-sided, 12.2% were right-sided and 56.1% were bilateral.
  - The concurrent onset of other clinical features of epilepsy (e.g., lip-smacking or other involuntary automatic behaviors, olfactory hallucinations). Approximately 40% of people with TEA report one of these symptoms in at least some attacks.
  - A clear-cut response to anticonvulsant therapy. Attacks ceased in 44 of 47 treated patients in one study.

== Neuroimaging during events ==
An individual in the midst of a prolonged TEA attack was given a PET scan which revealed "dramatic and circumscribed hypermetabolism in the left medial temporal lobe" and his "fluid-attenuated inversion-recovery MRI scan revealed high signal in the left hippocampus". Surface EEG recording during an amnesic attack was performed in ten TEA cases. "All recordings showed seizure activity, which in 8/10 cases involved both temporal lobes and in the others remained unilateral (1 left and one right-sided)." "Another patient was having an EEG when an amnesic event occurred; the trace showed a one-minute burst of left temporal spikes, followed by normalization of the EEG. MRI or CT scans have been reported in 62 TEA cases, with a very low incidence of clinically significant findings. Those focal brain lesions that have been detected have involved the medial temporal lobes. Typically, MRI and CT findings are not remarkable.

== Other transient amnestic syndromes ==
TEA is, at first, a challenge to distinguish its salient features during the event from transient global amnesia and dissociative amnesia, though other forms of transient amnesia can include reactions to various medications, closed head injury, and migraine. (Other sources of amnestic symptoms include herpes encephalitis, hypoxia, vascular or basal forebrain lesions, deep midline tumors, early dementia, and Korsakoff syndrome which is secondary to thiamine deficiency, most often the result of alcohol use disorder.)

The anatomical and pathophysiological basis of TEA is presumed to be similar to transient global amnesia (TGA), that is, it is likely to be primarily hippocampal in origin, but with more variable involvement of limbic and adjacent temporal lobe neocortical structures.

Typical presentation	TEA	TGA
Age at onset	early 60s	early 60s
Gender	67% male	46% male
Precipitating factors	70%:sleep/waking	80%: stress, exercise, cold water
History	epilepsy	migraine
Procedural memory	intact	intact
Recognizes family, home	usually	yes
Duration	1–60 minutes	2–8 hours
EEG	during: abnormal after: 40%+abnormal	during: normal after: 7% develop epilepsy
Other occasional symptoms	brief unresponsiveness	nausea, headache
Autonomic actions	Yes (40%)	no
Degree of amnesia of event	44% have partial recall	no recall
Personal identity	intact	intact
Persistent memory loss	80%+: ALF autobiographical amnesia topographical amnesia	30%+: ALF autobiographical amnesia.
Hallucination	42%: olfactory and gustatory	no
Treatment	anticonvulsant medication	none
Recurrence	12-13/year	rare

== Epidemiology ==
TEA characteristically starts in late middle-age. A sample of validated individuals with TEA had a mean age of 62 and a range of 44 to 77 years of age for the first attack. Research samples have been predominantly male by a ratio of two-to-one. The IQ of people diagnosed with TEA tends to be in the high average to superior range, perhaps due to selection bias.

== Persistent memory effects ==
Memory difficulties are among the most common issues for people with epilepsy, and "persistent memory impairment is reported by about 75% of patients with TEA." Other studies suggest the rate exceeds 80%. People who have had TEA attacks frequently report three kinds of persistent problems with memory:

- accelerated long term forgetting
- remote memory loss
- topographical amnesia

Importantly, these types of memory difficulty are not detected by standard neuropsychological tests.

=== Accelerated long-term forgetting (ALF) ===
Accelerated long-term forgetting (ALF) may be described as the abnormally rapid loss of recently learned material from memory. People who have experienced TEA often have difficulty in recalling information over days to weeks, even if this information was well learned initially. Even though accelerated memory loss is reported in 44% of TEA patients, it is undetected by standard tests of memory. Typically these tests examine the ability to store information for up to 30 minutes but the problem of accelerated long-term forgetting in TEA patients is not generally noticeable at this point. It becomes apparent over the following days and weeks. A recent study indicated that acquisition of recently everyday events can be normal after 30 minutes delay but that within 24 hours patients recall significantly less information than age and IQ matched control participants. Several non-mutually exclusive hypotheses have been advanced to explain why TEA patients experience accelerated forgetting.

- Seizure activity

Seizures in TEA patients commonly occur upon waking suggesting a link between TEA and sleep. It is possible that abnormal electrical activity during sleep disrupts the process of memory consolidation which normally occurs when we sleep. On-going subclinical seizure activity has implications for theories of memory consolidation, discussed below.

- Brain pathology

It is possible that a pre-existing condition affecting the temporal lobe may both cause attacks of TEA and interfere with the handling of memories. "Alternatively, episodes of TEA might themselves give rise to structural damage within the hippocampus or related structures, which could disrupt long term consolidation." One study found "subtle hippocampal volume loss" in patients with TEA, but the atrophy did not correspond to measures of either ALF or autobiographical memory loss, suggesting "a more diffuse physiological basis rather than being a consequence of structural damage."

- Anticonvulsant medication

Antiepileptic drugs sometimes affect memory. However, this is unlikely to be the cause of ALF in TEA, as patients tend to report memory problems before they start taking the antiepileptic drugs and can experience improvement in their memory after taking them.

- Psychological mechanisms

Research has reported that low mood and poor self-esteem are associated with memory problems. These are important factors when investigating patients with epilepsy in general. However, in TEA they do not appear to play an important role in accelerated forgetting.

=== Remote memory loss ===
70% of people with TEA notice a patchy but persistent loss of memories of events from their past personal experiences and this autobiographical amnesia has been reported in all cases in which accelerated forgetting was also present. This memory loss can occur in people whose ability to acquire new memories is intact. Studying this 'autobiographical amnesia' or 'focal retrograde amnesia' or 'delayed onset amnesia' has been challenging because people do not always realize they have forgotten events or periods of time until they have difficulty in retrieving memories of specific significant events, and find they cannot form a coherent recollection. At first they might think they have forgotten some isolated events due to normal forgetting, and not realize they have forgotten larger blocks of past time:

In our experience, patients most often present complaining of islands of memory loss that become apparent when discussing holidays or family events. We now ask patients with suspected TEA if they have gaps in their autobiographical memory, and especially about recall of holidays and other salient personal events. This is not, we would argue, because of the unique status of such events, but rather because it reflects the patchy nature of the remote memory deficit and the vulnerability of singular events. It is unlikely that a single week missing from everyday life would be noticed, owing to the repetitive nature of most day to day activities. In contrast, the loss of memory for last year's holiday brings the retrograde memory loss into sharp relief.

These memory deficits have been shown to extend across the entire lifespan and there are significant impairments across a wide range of different types of contextual information including event, place, perceptual and thought/emotion details. When asked to produce personal memories relating to a particular word (for example, "boat"), a 68-year-old epileptic patient failed to retrieve any episodes from his twenties or thirties. His performance on standard tests of anterograde memory was normal."

Autobiographical amnesia may be caused by repeated seizures in the temporal lobe resulting in the progressive "erasure" of memories. Alternatively, autobiographical memory loss may result from subtle changes in the temporal lobe which gives rise to temporal lobe epilepsy and to memory problems. The mechanism and etiology of this phenomenon remain controversial, especially as it is impossible to rule out prior subclinical epileptic activity which could be responsible for a failure to consolidate those seemingly forgotten memories. A recent imaging study that aimed to provide insight into the neural basis of these autobiographical memory deficits revealed that patients had significantly reduced activation in the right medial temporal lobes (and more specifically the right posterior parahippocampal cortex) and effective connectivity analysis indicated that there was reduced connectivity between this right parahippocampal region and the right middle temporal gyrus, which has been linked to semantic memory.

As well as these autobiographical memory deficits, patients have problems with personal semantic information (e.g., names of friends, jobs etc.), particularly for mid-life events. Knowledge for public semantic information such as famous faces, famous events, or new word acquisition appears to be broadly intact. However, for semantic information that has an episodic component, such as knowledge of whether people are dead or alive, patients with TEA often show significant deficits.

=== Topographical amnesia ===
Reported in 36% of cases, topographical amnesia refers to the inability of a person to recall the spatial cues necessary to navigate previously familiar terrain, or in some cases, in new places. People with such a symptom find themselves getting lost or confused about directions in circumstances where they would formerly been easily able to find their way. This symptom is problematic for the generally accepted hippocampal loci of TEA memory dysfunctions; such spatial information is generally thought to reside in other neuroanatomical structures.

== Treatment ==
TEA responds well to low doses of medicine used to treat epilepsy, (such as carbamazepine, lamotrigine or sodium valproate) resulting in a cessation of seizure activity in 45 of 47 patients. Medicated patients with continuing seizures experienced them less frequently. The recovery of lost memory, however, is not reported, though there are suggestions that the rate of decay of memory might be reduced with these medications.

== Implications for theories of memory ==
These forms of memory deficit raise issues about the nature of memories in the neuroanatomy and how conflicting observations can be reconciled with either the standard or the multiple trace models. It has been noted that "People with temporal lobe epilepsy provide a natural laboratory for the study of human memory." TEA, as a form of temporal lobe epilepsy, is of particular interest as one must consider both the loss of long-encoded memories (as long as 40 years or one's whole life) and the simultaneous failure of recently encoded but not immediately short-term memories. The issue of topographical amnesia, which would seem to involve parts of the brain not usually associated with other TEA symptoms, was referred to earlier. These are often considered different kinds of memories with distinct neuroanatomical loci, so that a model to explain both conditions with one etiology is elusive.

The major issues are summarized on the TIME website:

The cluster of memory problems occurring in patients with TEA – episodes of transient amnesia, accelerated forgetting and autobiographical amnesia – challenges both standard and multiple trace models of memory. The features of the amnesic episodes, the high frequency of olfactory hallucinations during attacks and findings from electroencephalography suggest that a medial temporal lobe focus is responsible for the seizures. On the 'standard model' of memory consolidation, which proposes that the medial temporal lobes play a time-limited role in memory processing, accelerated forgetting, occurring over days-1 week (TIME data), is a plausible result of structural or functional pathology in the medial temporal lobes. The associated autobiographical memory impairment is, however, a more puzzling consequence of medial temporal lobe pathology on this theory. It could be that epileptiform activity originating in the medial temporal lobe has the potential to disrupt the distributed neocortical traces required to maintain detailed autobiographical memories. Multiple trace theory, on the other hand predicts that disturbances of anterograde and retrograde episodic memory will go hand in hand. However it is not evident, in this theory, that partial damage to the hippocampus – of the kind that might plausibly cause of the phenomena of TEA – should lead to selective erasure of previously salient autobiographical memories. Thus neither of the leading current models of retrograde memory readily accounts for our observations.

There is support in the pattern of these deficits for "dissociation between the mechanisms subserving anterograde memory and those required to evoke remote episodic memories, and strengthens the evidence for a dissociation between knowledge of public and of personal events." The stability of some memories suggests further that 'focal retrograde amnesia' as it has been termed may be "due to erasure of representations rather than to a defective retrieval mechanism. Whether epileptic activity per se is responsible for this phenomenon requires further investigation." One issue raised by this hypothesis includes whether the reported amnesia in fact predates the TEA attack, and is possibly due to prior subclinical epileptic activity; it also highlights a variety of methodological concerns about studies of amnesia based largely on single case studies and cases with varying etiologies.

ALF and focal retrograde amnesia after TEA offer clues as to the nature of memory consolidation.

According to the standard view of memory consolidation, extensive retrograde amnesia is likely to be the result of damage to cortical memory representations or, more plausibly, the links between individual sensory elements that constitute an autobiographical episode. Recent studies of patients with medial temporal pathology have suggested that the hippocampal formation has a life long role in the storage of autobiographical memories. It is plausible therefore that medial temporal damage, whether occurring as a result of recurrent seizures and/or underlying subtle vascular damage, could result in both accelerated forgetting and retrograde amnesia. Further work investigating the relationships between seizure frequency, EEG activity, structural changes in the temporal lobes, and the severity of accelerated forgetting and autobiographical memory loss, is required to clarify these issues.

This view of consolidation has been disputed, as it seems to suggest consolidation occurs over long spans of time, not just minutes or days, and "requires physiological changes lasting years or decades." Such long-term consolidation processes would seem to require multiple stages of consolidation, which remain hypothetical.

A central concern in theories of memory consolidation is the role of sleep. "(O)ne set of observations suggests that consolidation may occur over any time interval, whereas another body of data suggests that these processes require sleep…. Clearly, both cannot be true. Resolving the inherent conflict between these perspectives strikes at the very heart of how biological mechanisms process memories after their initial encoding." TEA is related to sleep in nearly three-quarters of cases, and persistent memory problems could be the result of nocturnal, subclinical attacks disrupting on-going consolidation processes. Furthermore, as noted, abnormal EEG readings in people with TEA occur primarily in sleep EEG. However, the "reason for the close relationship of TEA with sleep is unclear. It may be that the transition from sleep to waking acts as a trigger to a seizure focus in the medial temporal lobe. Alternatively, amnesia upon waking may reflect persistent post-ictal dysfunction of medial temporal lobe structures following a seizure during sleep."
