= Semantic amnesia =

Semantic amnesia is a type of amnesia that affects semantic memory and is primarily manifested through difficulties with language use and acquisition, recall of facts and general knowledge. A patient with semantic amnesia would have damage to the temporal lobe.

== Background on semantic memory ==
=== Classification of memory ===
The Atkinson-Shiffrin Model of Memory showing that human memory is divided into 3 separate components - sensory register (incoming sensory information), short-term store or working memory, and long-term store. Declarative memory, under the long-term store, is subdivided into semantic and episodic memory.

Memory has two classifications—short-term memory and long-term memory. Long-term memory can store information for a long duration and is subdivided into non-declarative (implicit) memory for learned skills and habits, and declarative (explicit) memory for knowledge of facts and events.

=== Classification of declarative memory ===
Declarative memory consists of semantic memory and episodic memory. Semantic memory refers to acquired facts and general knowledge about the world. Examples include the name and physical attributes of objects and events, origins and history of objects, causes and effects of events or objects, associations between concepts, categories, opinions, beliefs, knowledge of historical events, etc. The context in which semantic information is learned does not need to be remembered, such as who was involved, what was around the object, when the event occurred, where the object was seen, or how the event took place. One way of testing an individual's semantic memory is through the person's naming ability. People could be asked to name a series of objects ranging from low difficulty levels to high difficulty levels. For example, one could be asked to name a flower (easy) and a pipette (difficult). In addition to naming tests, vocabulary tests are also used to assess people's ability to define words and to appropriately select synonyms of words

== Causes of semantic amnesia ==
Semantic amnesia occurs as a result of impairments to semantic memory. Patients with semantic amnesia experience difficulty in learning new semantic information while some are unable to retain and retrieve it. Essentially, the ability to learn new facts and general knowledge would be compromised. However, research has suggested that some patients may find it easier to learn new semantic information when they can relate to it on a personal level and make connections to facts and knowledge they already know.

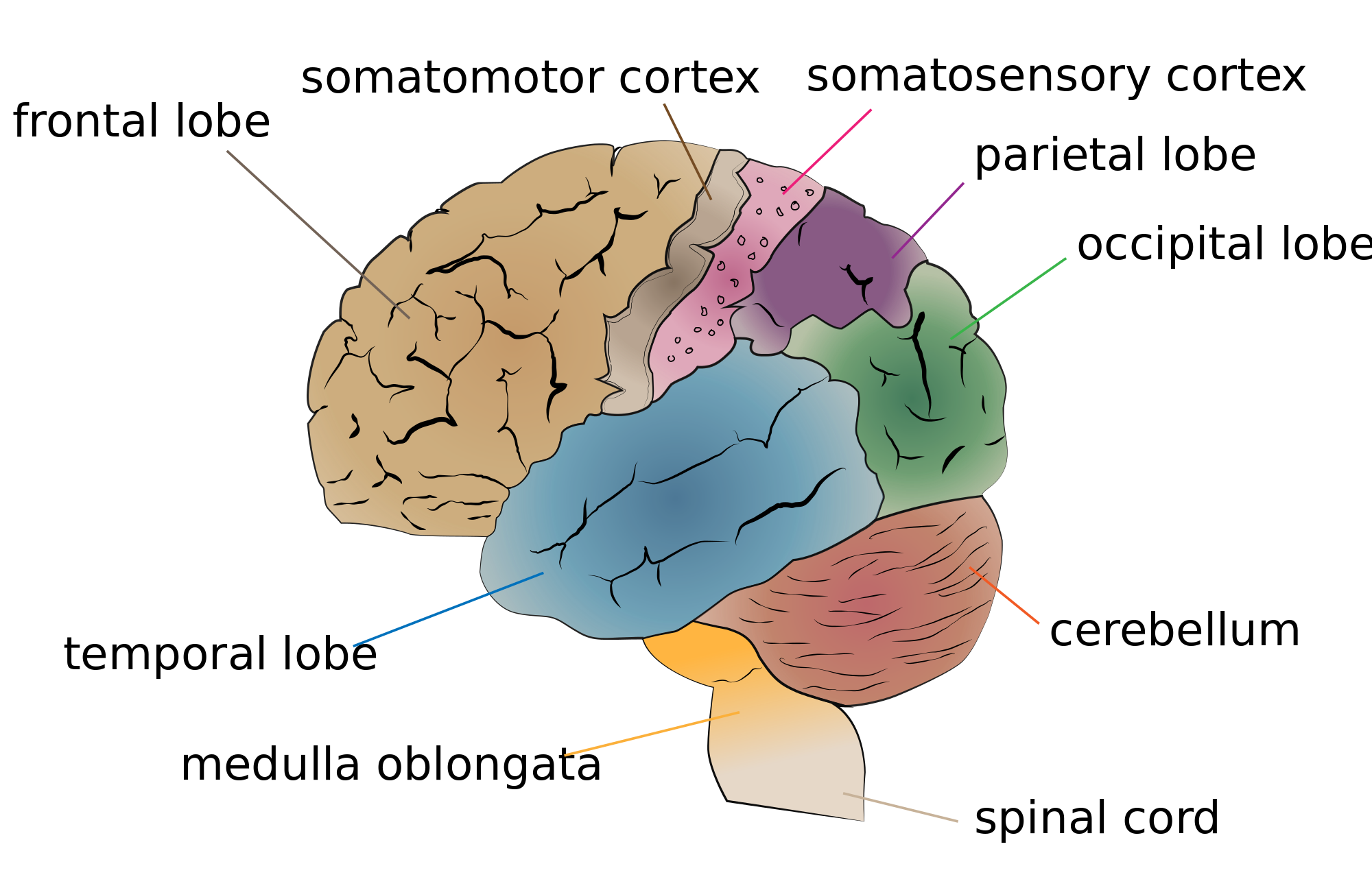
Anatomy of the brain showing the different lobes - frontal, pareital, occipital, and temporal lobe. The medial temporal lobe, responsible for long-term memory, consists of the hippocampus and perirhinal, parahippocampal, and entorhinal neocortical regions.

The medial temporal lobe is essential for declarative memory, and consists of different regions that contribute towards its function. It is located in the inner part of the temporal lobe, which is found near the division of the left and right hemisphere. The limbic system is situated deep inside the medial temporal lobe, and consists of the hippocampus, the amygdala, the cingulate gyrus, the thalamus, the hypothalamus, and other organs.

Episodic and semantic memory are both dependent on the hippocampal region.

Lesions to the medial temporal lobe affects both episodic and semantic memory. Immediate or short-term memory remains intact.

Damage to the hippocampus can have long-term implications on semantic memory as well as difficulties in remembering names, dates, and events. Recalling verbal information is affected when the damage is on the left hippocampus.

Figure 1. Table showing the memory type, neuroanatomy, symptoms associated with each memory dysfunction, and cognitive testing deficit [adapted from Matthews, B. (2015). Memory Dysfunction. Behavioral Neurology and Neuropsychiatry, 613-626].

Memory Type	Neuroanatomy	Symptoms	Cognitive Testing Deficit
Episodic	Medial temporal lobe	Unable to remember most recent experience (e.g. vacation); Unable to recall locations of places (e.g. where a particular store is located)	Recall of oral narrative and word list recall; Recall of figure location in space
Semantic	Anterior and inferior temporal lobe	Unable to recall the number of weeks in a year; Identifying most items as "things"; Unable to distinguish between objects or understand their meaning	General knowledge, picture naming, category fluency

== Symptoms ==
Semantic amnesia progressively evolves into dementia. Semantic dementia, a degenerative disorder, causes a progressive loss of semantic and conceptual knowledge. The region of the brain associated with semantic dementia is the left anterior temporal lobe Patients experience difficulties in verbal identification of stimuli and have poor word knowledge and association abilities. Other symptoms associate with semantic dementia include anomia (a form of aphasia), category fluency, comprehension, and language problems. However, visuospatial, attentional, and executive functions remain normal. Retention of numerical knowledge and music is unaffected.

Anomia is the inability to name objects, and is a common early symptom of semantic dementia. As a result, it becomes difficult to correctly name objects. For example, a pen may be referred to as a pencil, a car as a truck, or a glass may be considered to be a cup.

In later stages, the ability to categorize information deteriorates and no distinction remains between objects of different nature, such as hot versus cold, plant versus animal, etc. In fact, the perception towards objects also changes, such that everyday objects may appear strange or frightening.

Studies have shown that as semantic impairment deteriorates, autobiographical impairment also becomes worse. The patient is unable to remember events that occurred throughout their life, such as achievements, milestones, major setbacks and successes, to name a few. This finding suggests that episodic memory may also be affected.

Reasoning abilities remain relatively unaffected.

== Transient semantic amnesia case study ==
Transient semantic amnesia may result from a temporary dysfunction of the inferolateral temporal lobes. As the name suggests, this type of amnesia occurs temporarily and in most cases the patient's memory resumes back to normal.

An example of a case study of transient semantic amnesia involves a patient who was admitted into hospital with an acute loss of memory for common words and their meanings. For example, he was unable to understand and differentiate between a "car" and an "engine". His speech was fluent, he could perform quick mental maths, and when reviewed by the doctor, his orientation and verbal anterograde memory was normal. However he had been suffering from migraine for a long time. When reviewed after a month, the patient was back to normal based on a cognitive assessment as well as CT scans. He was also able to remember the sequence of events that led to his admission into the hospital.

This case suggests a transient loss of semantic memory, with preservation of episodic memory. Semantic dementia has been associated to this syndrome, with the following being core symptoms:

- Loss of semantic memory causing anomia and decreased word comprehension
- Language is unaffected (specifically syntax and phonology)
- Problem solving abilities are unaffected
- Preserved anterograde episodic memory

The first case of selective semantic memory deficit was characterized by a loss of verbal vocabulary and impaired knowledge of animals and objects.

== Treatment ==
Treatment for amnesia really depends on the cause. Options may include psychiatric treatment, medications, sedation, dietary advise, abstinence, and nursing homes

While there is no single medication that can cure semantic amnesia and dementia instantly, there are treatment options available to slow down the progression of the symptoms, especially anomia. Furthermore, amnesic patience may require repetition of information to learn, as perhaps they are unable to learn semantic information from reading it in just one trial, which normal healthy individuals would be able to do.

== Further research ==
Studies on dissociations between episodic and semantic memory have shown that while one form of memory can be impaired, the other can remain relatively intact. However, there is scope for research on exploring associations between the two, and whether their impairments can occur simultaneously or have an effect on each other.

== See also ==
- Alcoholic Korsakoff Syndrome
- Post-traumatic amnesia
- Dementia
- Semantic Dementia
- Alzheimer's
