= Dissociative amnesia =

Memory disorder

- Other names: Psychogenic amnesia
- Specialty: Psychiatry, Neurology
- Symptoms: Memory loss

Dissociative amnesia or psychogenic amnesia is a dissociative disorder characterized by retrospectively reported memory gaps. These gaps involve an inability to recall personal information, usually of a traumatic or stressful nature. The concept is scientifically controversial and remains disputed.

Dissociative amnesia was previously known as psychogenic amnesia, a memory disorder, which was characterized by sudden retrograde episodic memory loss, said to occur for a period of time ranging from hours to years to decades.

The atypical clinical syndrome of the memory disorder (as opposed to organic amnesia) is that a person with dissociative amnesia is profoundly unable to remember personal information about themselves; there is a lack of conscious self-knowledge which affects even simple self-knowledge, such as who they are. Dissociative amnesia is distinguished from organic amnesia in that it is supposed to result from a nonorganic cause: no structural brain damage should be evident but some form of psychological stress should precipitate the amnesia. Dissociative amnesia as a memory disorder is controversial.

== Definition ==
Dissociative amnesia is the presence of retrograde amnesia (the inability to retrieve stored memories leading up to the onset of amnesia), and an absence of anterograde amnesia (the inability to form new long-term memories). Access to episodic memory can be impeded, while the degree of impairment to short term memory, semantic memory and procedural memory is thought to vary among cases. If other memory processes are affected, they are usually much less severely affected than retrograde autobiographical memory, which is taken as the hallmark of dissociative amnesia. However the wide variability of memory impairment among cases of dissociative amnesia raises questions as to its true neuropsychological criteria, as despite intense study of a wide range of cases there is little consensus of which memory deficits are specific to dissociative amnesia.

Past literature has suggested dissociative amnesia can be 'situation-specific' or 'global-transient', the former referring to memory loss for a particular incident, and the latter relating to large retrograde amnesic gaps of up to many years in personal identity. The most commonly cited examples of global-transient dissociative amnesia are 'fugue states', of which there is a sudden retrograde loss of autobiographical memory resulting in impairment of personal identity and usually accompanied by a period of wandering. Suspected cases of dissociative amnesia have been heavily reported throughout the literature since 1935 where it was reported by Abeles and Schilder. There are many clinical anecdotes of dissociative amnesia attributed to stressors ranging from cases of child sexual abuse to soldiers returning from combat.

== Cause ==
Dissociative amnesia is commonly associated with adverse life events, personal or interpersonal conflicts, or stress. Onset is typically acute, occurring after traumatic or highly stressful events (e.g., war, natural disaster, maltreatment). Onset may occur immediately after the exposure or after a significant delay. However, the specific neurological cause of dissociative amnesia is controversial. Nevertheless, there are two alternative accounts that aim to explain the mechanisms involved in dissociative amnesia. Markowitsch and colleagues have suggested that the memory loss occurs as a result of a stress hormone mediated desynchronization and deactivation of fronto-temporal memory systems. Kopelman, alternatively, has proposed that the memory systems are deactivated as a result of inhibitory mechanism that is mediated by prefrontal regions. Additional evidence was found for the second account, suggesting that an inhibitory control mechanism suppresses autobiographical memory retrieval in dissociative amnesia, with right anterior dorsolateral prefrontal cortex (raDLPFC) down-regulating hippocampus. However, how psychological experiences lead to engagement of the right prefrontal cortex’s inhibitory control mechanisms remains to be researched.

Even in cases of organic amnesia, where there is lesion or structural damage to the brain, caution must still be taken in defining causation, as only damage to areas of the brain crucial to memory processing is possible to result in memory impairment. Organic causes of amnesia can be difficult to detect, and often both organic cause and psychological triggers can be entangled. Failure to find an organic cause may result in the diagnosis that the amnesia is psychological, however it is possible that some organic causes may fall below a threshold of detection, while other neurological ails are thought to be unequivocally organic (such as a migraine) even though no functional damage is evident. Possible malingering must also be taken into account. Some researchers have cautioned against dissociative amnesia becoming a "wastebasket" diagnosis when organic amnesia is not apparent. Other researchers have hastened to defend the notion of dissociative amnesia and its right not to be dismissed as a clinical disorder. Diagnoses of dissociative amnesia have dropped since agreement in the field of transient global amnesia, suggesting some over diagnosis at least. Speculation also exists about dissociative amnesia due to its similarities with 'pure retrograde amnesia', as both share similar retrograde loss of memory. Also, although no functional damage or brain lesions are evident in the case of pure retrograde amnesia, unlike dissociative amnesia it is not thought that purely psychological or 'psychogenic triggers' are relevant to pure retrograde amnesia. Psychological triggers such as emotional stress are common in everyday life, yet pure retrograde amnesia is considered very rare. Also the potential for organic damage to fall below threshold of being identified does not necessarily mean it is not present, and it is highly likely that both psychological factors and organic cause exist in pure retrograde amnesia.

=== Comparison with organic amnesia ===
Dissociative amnesia is supposed to differ from organic amnesia in a number of ways; one being that unlike organic amnesia, dissociative amnesia is thought to occur when no structural damage to the brain or brain lesion is evident. Psychological triggers are instead considered as preceding dissociative amnesia, and indeed many anecdotal case studies which are cited as evidence of dissociative amnesia hail from traumatic experiences such as World War II. As aforementioned however, an etiology of dissociative amnesia is controversial as causation is not always clear, and both elements of psychological stress and organic amnesia may be present among cases. Often, but not necessarily, a premorbid history of dissociative illness such as depression is thought to be present in conjunction to triggers of psychological stress. Lack of psychological evidence precipitating amnesia does not mean there is not any, for example trauma during childhood has even been cited as triggering amnesia later in life, but such an argument runs the risk of dissociative amnesia becoming an umbrella term for any amnesia of which there is no apparent organic cause. Due to organic amnesia often being difficult to detect, defining between organic and dissociative amnesia is not easy and often context of precipitating experiences are considered (for example, if there has been drug abuse) as well as the symptomology the patient presents with. dissociative amnesia is supposed to differ from organic amnesia qualitatively in that retrograde loss of autobiographical memory while semantic memory remains intact is said to be specific of dissociative amnesia. Another difference that has been cited between organic and dissociative amnesia is the temporal gradient of retrograde loss of autobiographical memory. The temporal gradient of loss in most cases of organic amnesia is said to be steepest at its most recent premorbid period, whereas for dissociative amnesia the temporal gradient of retrograde autobiographical memory loss is said to be quite consistently flat. Although there is much literature on dissociative amnesia as dissimilar to organic amnesia, the distinction between neurological and psychological features is often difficult to discern and remains controversial.

== Diagnosis ==
Brain activity can be assessed functionally for dissociative amnesia using imaging techniques such as fMRI, PET and EEG, in accordance with clinical data. Some research has suggested that organic and dissociative amnesia to some extent share the involvement of the same structures of the temporo-frontal region in the brain. It has been suggested that deficits in episodic memory may be attributable to dysfunction in the limbic system, while self-identity deficits have been suggested as attributable to functional changes related to the posterior parietal cortex. To reiterate however, care must be taken when attempting to define causation as only ad hoc reasoning about the aetiology of dissociative amnesia is possible, which means cause and consequence can be infeasible to untangle.

== Treatments ==
Because dissociative amnesia is largely defined by its lack of physical damage to the brain, treatment by physical methods is difficult. Nonetheless, distinguishing between organic and dissociative memory loss has been described as an essential first-step in effective treatments. Treatments in the past have attempted to alleviate psychogenic amnesia by treating the mind itself, as guided by theories which range from notions such as 'betrayal theory' to account for memory loss attributed to protracted abuse by caregivers to the amnesia as a form of self-punishment in a Freudian sense, with the obliteration of personal identity as an alternative to suicide.

Treatment attempts often have revolved around trying to discover what traumatic event had caused the amnesia, and drugs such as intravenously administered barbiturates (often thought of as 'truth serum') were popular as treatment for dissociative amnesia during World War II; benzodiazepines may have been substituted later. 'Truth serum' drugs were thought to work by making a painful memory more tolerable when expressed through relieving the strength of an emotion attached to a memory. Under the influence of these 'truth' drugs the patient would more readily talk about what had occurred to them. However, information elicited from patients under the influence of drugs such as barbiturates would be a mixture of truth and fantasy, and was thus not regarded as scientific in gathering accurate evidence for past events. Often treatment was aimed at treating the patient as a whole, and probably varied in practice in different places. Hypnosis was also popular as a means for gaining information from people about their past experiences, but like 'truth' drugs really only served to lower the threshold of suggestibility so that the patient would speak easily but not necessarily truthfully. If no motive for the amnesia was immediately apparent, deeper motives were usually sought by questioning the patient more intensely, often in conjunction with hypnosis and 'truth' drugs. In many cases, however, patients were found to spontaneously recover from their amnesia on their own accord so no treatment was required.

== Controversy ==
The concept is scientifically controversial and remains disputed. Critics argue dissociative amnesia is merely a rebranding of the discredited repressed memory concept, and that "the mechanisms described in the DSM–5 as “dissociative amnesia” do not correspond to current knowledge of how memory works, either in an ordinary way or in intense stress circumstances".

== In popular culture ==
The term repressed memory somewhat persists in colloquial mention, despite the concept proving obsolete in academic spaces. Dissociative amnesia is a common fictional plot device in many films, books and other media. Examples include William Shakespeare's King Lear, who experienced amnesia and madness following a betrayal by his daughters; and the title character Nina in Nicolas Dalayrac's 1786 opera. Sunny, the main character in the 2020 video game Omori, has been described by critics as having dissociative amnesia.

== See also ==
- Depersonalization
- Dissociative disorders
- Effects of stress on memory
