= Pill reminder =

Device that reminds users to take medications

A pill reminder is any device that reminds users to take medications. Traditional pill reminders are pill containers with electric timers attached, which can be preset for certain times of the day to set off an alarm.

More sophisticated pill reminders can also detect when they have been opened, and therefore when the user is away during the time they were supposed to take their medication, they will be reminded of it when they return. This reminder can be in the form of a light, which also helps for deaf or hearing-impaired users.

== Mobile app ==
A newer type of pill reminder is a mobile app that reminds the owner to take the medication. Some of these applications might effectively support adherence to taking medications.

== See also ==
- Pill dispenser
- Pill organizer
