= Ribot's law =

Postulate about retrograde amnesia

Ribot's law (English: /riːˈboʊ/ ree-BOH, French: [ʁibo]) of retrograde amnesia was hypothesized in 1881 by Théodule Ribot. It states that there is a time gradient in retrograde amnesia, so that recent memories are more likely to be lost than the more remote memories. Not all patients with retrograde amnesia report the symptoms of Ribot's law.

== History and context ==
Ribot's law was first postulated by the French psychologist Théodule Ribot (1839–1916), who is recognized as one of the pioneer 19th century advocates for psychology as an objective and biologically based empirical field. Ribot's split from the mainstream "Eclectic" psychology of the era was associated with a transition from philosophical to evolutionary explanations of human psychology and behavior. As Ribot was not a true experimentalist himself, this increased focus on the natural science basis of human mentality was manifested in an interest for case studies and diseases of dysfunction which helped to shape theories of psychological function. Ribot's law actually was first defined in terms of a broad generalization of functional decline in psychopathology: the observation that functions acquired most recently are the first to degenerate. However, in the current context of neuroscience research, Ribot's law is used almost exclusively to describe the perceived effect of older memories being less prone to disruption.

In his 1882 book, "Diseases of Memory: An Essay in the Positive Psychology", Ribot explained the retroactive phenomena of trauma or event-induced memory loss. Patients who incurred amnesia from a specific event such as an accident often also lost memory of the events leading up to the incident as well. In the case of some, this retrograde loss included several years leading up to the precipitating event of injury or trauma had occurred – yet left much older memories intact – suggesting that the effect was not just due to interference with consolidation of memories immediately before brain damage.

Other historical accounts supporting the greater strength of older memories include some studies of aphasia starting as early as the late 1700s, in which bilingual patients recovered different languages with differential progress. In some cases, aphasics recover or preferentially improve only the first-acquired language, although this only seems to be the case mostly in people who were never truly fluent in their secondary language.

Currently, Ribot's law is not universally accepted as a supporting example for memory consolidation and storage. As a component of the standard model memory of systems consolidation, it is challenged by the multiple trace theory which states that the hippocampus is always activated in the storage and retrieval of episodic memory regardless of memory age.

== Evidence ==
A large body of research supports the predictions of Ribot's law. The theory concerns the relative strength of memories over time, which is not directly testable. Instead, scientists investigate the processes of forgetting (amnesia), and recollection. Ribot's law states that following a disruptive event, patients will show a temporally graded retrograde amnesia that preferentially spares more distant memories.

Experimental evidence largely confirms these predictions. In a study of electroconvulsive shock therapy patients, memories formed at least four years prior to treatment were unaffected, while more recent ones were impaired. An experiment with rats showed similar results. Rats were conditioned to fear stimuli in two different contexts: one 50 days before receiving hippocampal brain lesions, and the other 1 day before lesioning. Subsequently, they only showed fear memory in the 50-day-old context.

Many neurological disorders, including Alzheimer's disease, are also associated with a temporally graded retrograde amnesia, indicating that older memories are somehow strengthened against degeneration while newer memories are not. Although the mechanism for this strengthening is unclear, some models exist to explain the effects.

== Theories ==
=== The standard model of systems consolidation ===
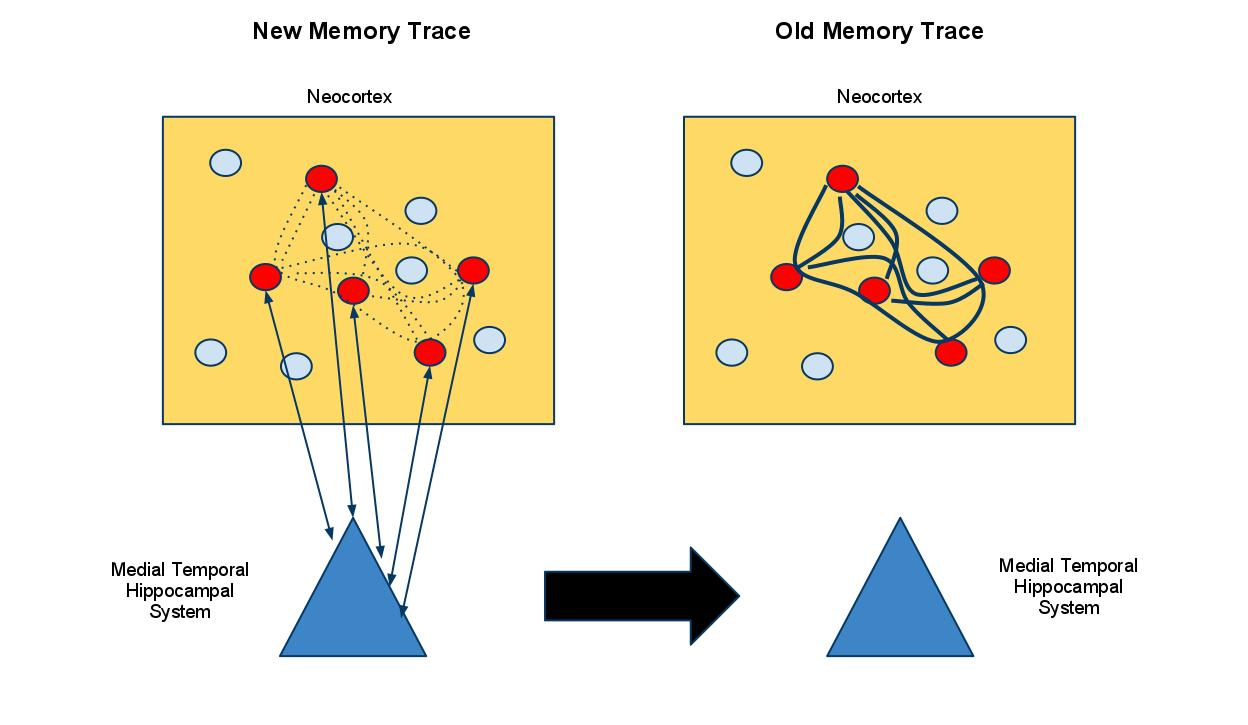
Figure 1. Depiction of standard model

Initially proposed in 1984 by Larry Squire, Neal Cohen, and Lynn Nadel, the standard model of systems consolidation is a contemporary theory used to explain the cognitive processes behind Ribot's law. In the model, interaction between the medial temporal hippocampus (MTH) and multiple areas in the neocortex lead to the formation of a cortical trace which represents a single memory. While this MTH-neocortex interaction is initially required to maintain the memory trace, the model predicts that over time the importance of the MTH becomes diminished and eventually is unnecessary for the storage of the memory trace. The medial temporal hippocampus mediates memory formation by maintaining the connections between various neocortical regions that make up each memory trace. At first the associations between neocortical areas that make up a newly formed memory trace are weak, however repeated activation of these areas in succession lead to "consolidation" of the trace within the neocortex. Once consolidation is sufficiently complete, the memory trace becomes mediated through neocortical activity alone and the MTH is no longer necessary for re-activation.

Figure 1 provides a visual explanation of the standard model. Initially, the memory trace (features of the experience represented by red circles) is weak in the neocortex and is reliant on its connections to the medial temporal hippocampal system (MTH) for retrieval. Over time, an intrinsic process results in the strengthening of the connections between memory trace representations in the neocortex. Since the connections are consolidated, the memory can now be retrieved without the hippocampus.

While never explicitly described by Squire and colleagues, the timescale of MTH-dependence in memory formation and maintenance is believed to vary by species as well as by the extent of hippocampal damage. For example, hippocampal lesion experiments with mouse models have shown retrograde amnesia for approximately one week prior to surgery, while case studies of human subjects with similar hippocampal damage have had retrograde amnesia limited to around two to three years prior to the accident.

The standard model of systems consolidation largely applies to the formation of declarative memories, which include semantic, factual memories and episodic, autobiographical memories. This has been supported by case studies of human patients with MTH lesions who exhibit difficulties in remembering experiences and fact learned post-surgery, however are able to retain motor and skill memories such as how to ride a bike or perform mirror tracing tasks.
