= Pill organizer =

Container for medications

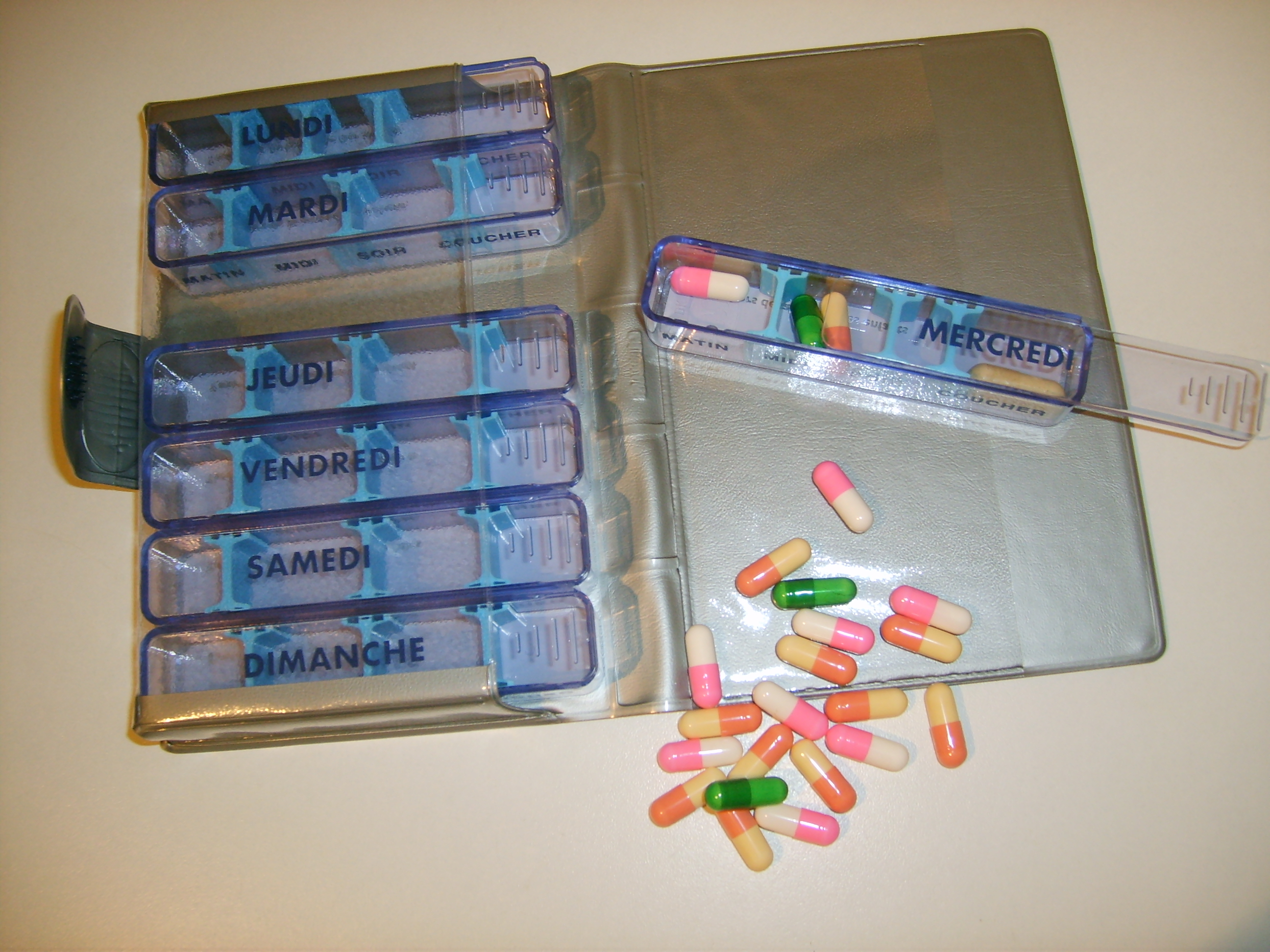
A pill organiser covering 4 daily doses over one week (labelled in French)

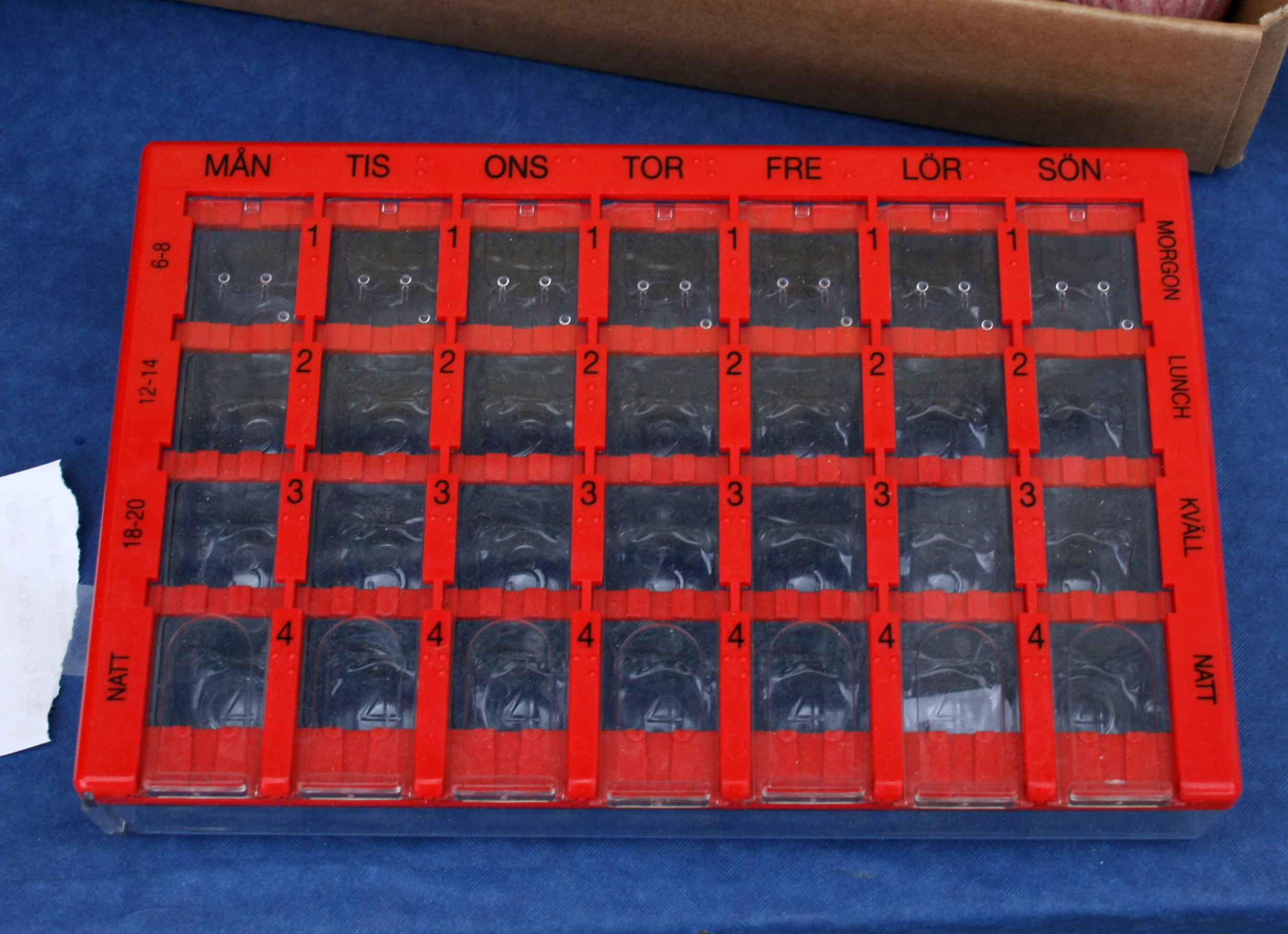
Swedish pill organiser, "Dosett".

A pill organizer (or pill organiser), pill container, dosette box, pillcase or pillbox is a multicompartment compliance aid for storing scheduled doses of medications. Pill organizers usually have square-shaped compartments for each day of the week, although other more compact and discreet versions have come to market, including cylindrical and pen-shaped cases. Some organizers have sections corresponding to times of the day.

== History ==
The first pill organizer was invented by Phil Cherrin of Cherrin Brothers Corporation in Detroit, Michigan. The brothers patent was filed July 21, 1966, US-3432951-A, and approved on March 18, 1969. This patent for "a compartmented container made of clear plastic for use in dispensing medicinal pills at periodic intervals such as daily on a mistake-proof basis" has been cited as the first, seminal patent for all subsequent pill organizer patent filings. Cherrin Brothers Corporation, a distributor of candy, tobacco and personal care paper products was a pioneer in the design of plastics for packaging consumables that preserved freshness and bundled multi-packs including but not limited to seminal patents for the clear invoice/packing slip envelope used by FedEx/UPS/USPS etc. today as well as the adhesive tape dispenser.

== Usage ==
Pill organizers are viewed as a way to prevent or reduce medication errors on the part of the patient. Pill organizers are useful for all types of patients, including the elderly, those who have memory deficiencies, and those taking multiple medications as an aid in remembering to take proper doses of their medications in compliance with their doctor's recommended dose. They allow a patient to know whether or not they have taken a particular dose of their medication; if a pill still remains in its compartment, it is apparent that it has not yet been taken, whereas if it is missing, it has already been taken.

Pill organizers often have various features to make them easier for special-needs patients to use, such as color-coding, Braille for the blind, or a locking mechanism to prevent double dosing. Some organizers used for diabetes patients have sections for insulin and hypodermic syringes.

Some pharmacists will pre-load pills into pill organizers for their patients, as a convenient service.

Evidence of effectiveness is not strong and they have been linked to medication errors.

== Electronic pill organizers ==
Electronic pill organizers, pill dispensers, and pill reminders have been developed that alert patients when their prescription medication, OTC medication, or daily food supplements must be taken. These devices have been credited with saving lives and saving money in the health care system. Advanced models can be linked via the Internet to a medical facility, to aid in monitoring and reminding a patient to take his/her medications.
