= Sywald Skeid =

Romanian-born man (born 1971)

Sywald Skeid (born Ciprian Skeid, and also known by various other names, including Philip Staufen, Georges Lecuit, Keith Ryan, Mike Jones, and Mr. Nobody) (born 1971) is a Romanian-born man who wandered into a hospital emergency department in Toronto, Ontario, Canada on November 28, 1999, seemingly the victim of an attack, and apparently suffering from amnesia. The name Philip Staufen, which he used during most of his time in Canada, is actually that of a medieval German king (see Philip of Swabia), and was given to Skeid by hospital staff because it was among the first words spoken by him during his hospitalization.

Before disappearing in 2004, Skeid undertook a campaign to gain Canadian citizenship that was ultimately denied by authorities. He suggested the birthdate June 7, 1975 for identification purposes. His real birthdate remains unknown, but in the June 2007 article in GQ Magazine in which his true identity and details of his early life were first revealed his age is given as 36.

There is no evidence he ever suffered from amnesia.

== Background and early life ==
Born in Timișoara, Romania, where he lived until the age of nineteen, Skeid, who studied the violin, was named for famous composer Ciprian Porumbescu. His mother (died 2000) worked in a bread factory and his father (died 2002), an alcoholic who Skeid alleges physically abused his wife and son, worked at a meat processing plant. Skeid has one sibling, an older sister named Daniela.

At the age of eighteen, Skeid was conscripted into the army, which he has described as "a year of hell". At nineteen, he went to live with a friend in Germany, where he worked as a cook in an Italian restaurant. At 22, following a brief return to Romania, Skeid moved to Paris, where a friend states Skeid had an affair with another man. Following periods in Hungary and Italy, he moved to London, which he eventually left with a plan of going to America.

== Arrival at a Toronto hospital ==
On November 28, 1999, Skeid appeared at a Toronto hospital. Then probably in his mid-twenties, he appeared to have been the victim of a mugging. His nose was broken, and he was unable to walk. In addition, his wallet was missing, the tags had been removed from his clothing, and he carried no identification.

Skeid claimed to have no idea who he was, and was diagnosed with post-concussive global amnesia. He mentioned Australia, but linguistic experts said that he had a slight Yorkshire accent. He also spoke fluent French and Italian, and could read Latin. The media picked up on the story and began referring to him as "Mr. Nobody."

== After release ==
Skeid was released from hospital and stayed in a shelter for three weeks, then accepted an offer of lodging from an Ontario couple, and was able to collect welfare money. Soon his photograph and fingerprints were being circulated internationally and he was the subject of television shows in Canada, Britain, and Australia, yet no clues as to his true identity were discovered. Meanwhile, Skeid refused offers of free expert treatment for his amnesia. He moved into a Toronto lodging house, then briefly to Montreal.

In November 2000, Skeid moved to Vancouver, British Columbia, where he met lawyer Manuel Azevedo and began lobbying to be granted Canadian citizenship and a Canadian birth certificate, ostensibly so that he could travel in order to discover his true identity. On May 28, 2001 a British Columbia court denied Skeid's petition for a birth certificate, but on June 5, Minister Elinor Caplan offered him a "Minister's Permit" to stay and work in Canada for eighteen months. Skeid refused.

== Pornography claims ==
On June 15, 2001, Skeid signed a second affidavit and issued a press release announcing a hunger strike. About the same time, gay porn model Sean Spence claimed that Skeid was actually a pornographic model named Georges Lecuit, who had last worked in Britain. In July, Spence provided photographs of Georges Lecuit to Detective Stephen Bone of Toronto Police, who had been working on the case. The photographs show a man bearing a striking similarity to Staufen, though with a different hairstyle (images of "Lecuit" and "Staufen" are available). Skeid refuses to confirm or deny these claims.

== Name changes and legal troubles ==
In mid-July, Skeid married his lawyer's daughter Nathalie Herve, who had dual Canadian and Portuguese citizenship, in Vancouver, and accepted the Minister's Permit (backdated to July 5). Manuel Azevedo subsequently resigned as Skeid's lawyer.

On August 29, 2001, Skeid's appeal for a Canadian birth certificate was rejected. Immigration officials noted that Skeid appeared to have surgically altered his nose.

Skeid began to change his name frequently. He first changed his name to Keith Ryan on October 25, 2001. In early 2002, Skeid changed his name again, this time to Sywald Skeid. The following January, after Skeid's permit had expired, he and his wife moved to Ottawa, then Montreal, and then Halifax, Nova Scotia.

In mid-February 2004, it emerged that a French man named Georges Lecuit had reported his passport stolen in 1998. Staufen was arrested and jailed, then released on condition that he report regularly to Immigration, which he last did on October 4, 2004, in Victoria, British Columbia. Skeid and Herve both subsequently disappeared.

== The Piano Man ==
In April 2005, a man matching Skeid's description was discovered wandering on a beach on the Isle of Sheppey in Kent, wearing a dripping-wet suit and tie. The man did not speak, but was a skilled pianist, a fact discovered after the man was provided a piano when he drew a detailed sketch of a grand piano. It was later confirmed that this "Piano Man" (as he was dubbed by the media) was not Skeid, but rather a German named Andreas Grassl.

== Move to Portugal ==
In March 2006, Skeid went to Lisbon to join his wife, who had gone ahead to make inquiries about obtaining Portuguese citizenship for Skeid. Skeid and Herve subsequently separated. As of 2007, Skeid was residing in Lisbon.

== Revelation of true identity ==
Skeid's true identity was revealed for the first time in the June, 2007 issue of GQ magazine.

According to Skeid: "I came from Romania, a place I loathe. I'd rather be a fake nobody than the real me. At first I tried not to be anyone at all. Then I tried to become someone - and then someone better."
