= Théodule-Armand Ribot =

French psychologist (1839–1916)

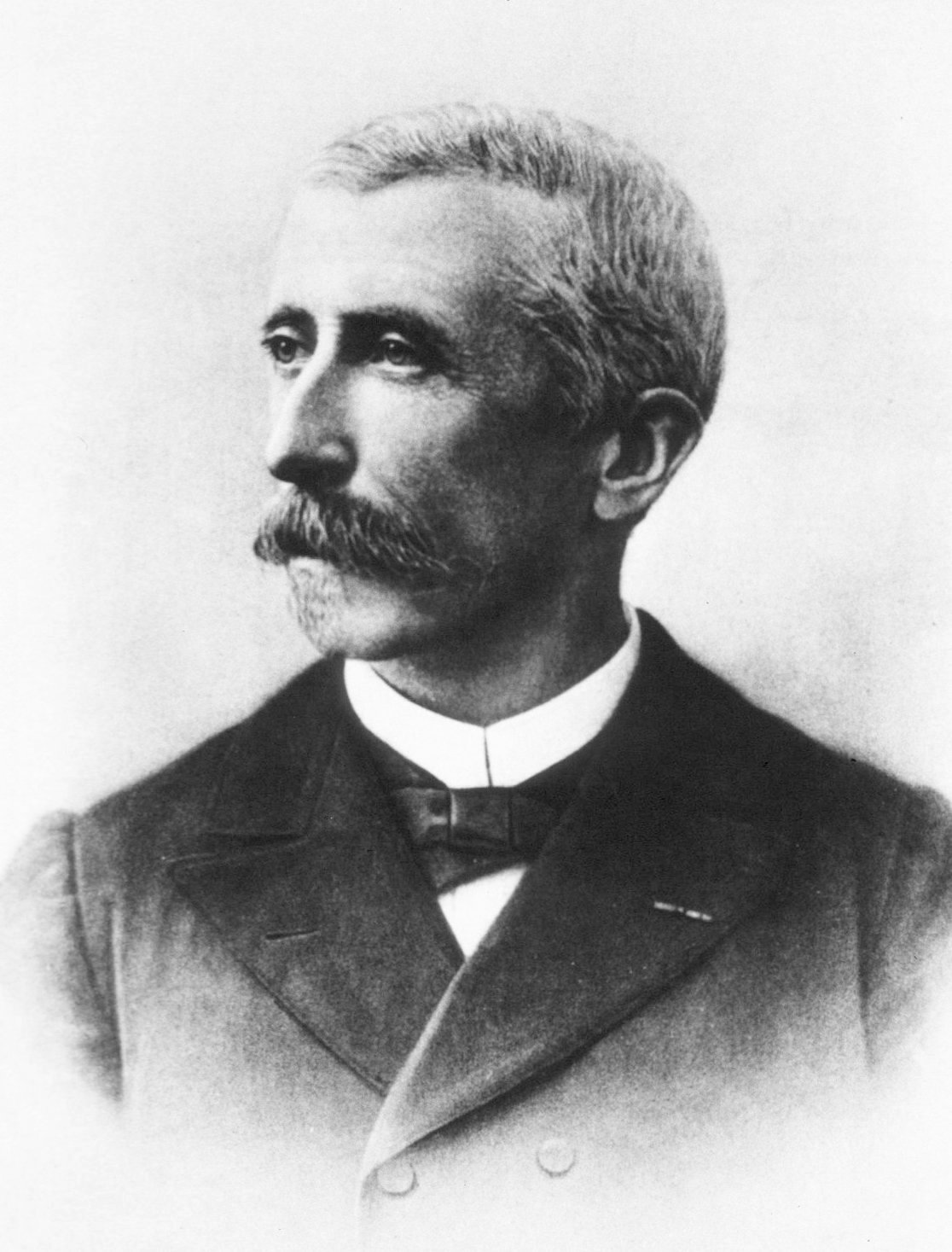
- Born: 18 December 1839; Guingamp, France
- Died: 9 December 1916 (aged 76); Paris, France
- Education: École Normale Supérieure; University of Paris
- Known for: Positive psychology
- Scientific career
- Fields: Psychology
- Workplaces: University of Paris; Collège de France
- Academic advisors: Elme Marie Caro
- Notable students: Alfred Binet; Georges Dumas

Théodule-Armand Ribot (English: /riːˈboʊ/ ree-BOH, French: [teɔdyl aʁmɑ̃ ʁibo]; 18 December 1839 – 9 December 1916) was a French psychologist.

== Biography ==
He was born at Guingamp, and was educated at the Lycée de St Brieuc. He is known as the founder of scientific psychology in France, and gave his name to Ribot's Law regarding retrograde amnesia.

In 1856 he began to teach, and was admitted to the École Normale Supérieure in 1862.

He passed his agrégation in philosophy; this allowed him to teach in high school. He worked as a high school teacher in Vesoul (1866–1868), and then in Laval (1868–1872).

On 9 April 1888 at the Collège de France he gave the first lecture in psychology in France.

In 1885 he gave a course of lectures on experimental psychology at the Sorbonne, and in 1888 was appointed professor of that subject at the College of France. His thesis for his doctors' degree, republished in 1882, Hérédité: étude psychologique (5th ed., 1889), was his most important and best known book.

L'Hérédité psychologique is considered to have introduced Darwinian and Spencerian evolutionary ideas to France.

Following the experimental and synthetic methods, he brought together a large number of instances of inherited peculiarities. He paid particular attention to the physical element of mental life, ignoring all spiritual or nonmaterial factors in man. In his work on La Psychologie anglaise contemporaine: l'école expérimentale (1870), he showed his sympathy with the sensationalist school, and again in his translation of Herbert Spencer's Principles of Psychology.

Ribot was in 1889 the co-president (with Jean-Martin Charcot) of the first international congress for experimental psychology and in 1890 the president for the fourth congress. From the first 12 such international congresses, the International Union of Psychological Science eventually emerged.

Besides numerous articles, he wrote on Arthur Schopenhauer, Philosophie de Schopenhauer (1874; 7th ed., 1896), and on the contemporary psychology of Germany (La Psychologie allemande contemporaine, 1879; 13th ed., 1898), also four little monographs on Les Maladies de la mémoire (1881; x3th ed., 1898); De la volonté (1883; 14th ed., 1899); De la personnalité (1885; 8th ed., 1899); and La Psychologie de l'attention (1888), which supplied useful data to the study of mental illness.

In 1896 he introduced the term Anhedonia describing the inability to feel pleasure.

== Bibliography ==
=== Works ===
- La Psychologie anglaise contemporaine: l'école expérimentale (1870)
- La philosophie de Schopenhauer (1874)
- Psychologie de l'attention (1889)
- La Psychologie des sentiments (1896)
- L'Evolution des idées générales (1897)
- Essai sur l'imagination créatrice (1900)
- La Logique des sentiments (1904)
- Essai sur les passions (1906)

=== English editions ===
- English Psychology (1873)
- Heredity: a Psychological Study of its Phenomena, Laws, Causes, and Consequences (1875)
- Diseases of Memory: An Essay in the Positive Psychology (1882)
- Diseases of the Will (New York, 1884), (tr. MM Snell, Open Court Publishing, Chicago 1894; 1903)
- German Psychology of to-day, tr. JM Baldwin (New York, 1886)
- The Psychology of Attention Archive.org
- Diseases of Personality (Chicago, 1895)
- The Psychology of the Emotions (1897) Internet Archive
- The Evolution of General Ideas, tr. FA Welby (Chicago, 1899)
- Essay on the Creative Imagination, tr. AHN Baron (1906). Librivox audio in English

== See also ==
- A Clinical Lesson at the Salpêtrière – 1887 group tableau portrait by André Brouillet
