= Semantic feature-comparison model =

Type of semantic model

The semantic feature comparison model is used "to derive predictions about categorization times in a situation where a subject must rapidly decide whether a test item is a member of a particular target category". In this semantic model, there is an assumption that certain occurrences are categorized using its features or attributes of the two subjects that represent the part and the group. A statement often used to explain this model is "a robin is a bird". The meaning of the words robin and bird are stored in the memory by virtue of a list of features which can be used to ultimately define their categories, although the extent of their association with a particular category varies.

== History ==
This model was conceptualized by Edward Smith, Edward Shoben and Lance Rips in 1974 after they derived various observations from semantic verification experiments conducted at the time. Respondents merely have to answer "true" or "false" to given sentences. Out of these experiments, they observed that people respond faster when (1) statements are true, (2) nouns are members of smaller categories, (3) items are "typical" or commonly associated with the category (also called prototypes), and (4) items are primed by a similar item previously given (University of Alaska Anchorage, n.d.). In the latter item, respondents will respond faster to the latter statement since the category bird has been primed. Based on the previous observations, the proponents were able to come up with the semantic feature comparison model.

== Theory ==
The cognitive approach consists of two concepts: information processing depends on internal representations, and that mental representations undergo transformations. For the first concept, we could describe an object in a number of ways, with drawings, equations, or verbal descriptions, but it is up to the recipient to have a background understanding of the context to which the object is being described in order to fully comprehend the deliverable. The second concept explains how memory can alter the way we perceive representations of something, by determining the sequence in which the information is processed based on previous experiences.

== Features ==
The main features of the model, as discussed by Smith et al. (1974), are the defining features and the characteristic features. Defining features refer to the characteristics that are essential elements of the category, the non-negotiable, so to speak. For example, the 'bird' category includes such defining features as 'they have wings', 'feathers', 'they lay eggs', etc. Characteristic features refer to the elements usually found or inherent to category members but are not found in all, or non-essentials. For example, birds 'fly', – that is characteristic because while most birds fly, there are some who cannot.

The model has two stages for decision making. First, all features of the two concepts (bird and robin, in our example) are compared to find out how alike they are. If the decision is that they are very similar or very dissimilar, then a true or false decision can be made. Second, if the characteristics/features are in-between then the focus shifts to the defining features in order to decide if the example possesses enough features of the category, thus, categorization depends on similarity and not on the size of the category.
