= Retrograde amnesia =

Permanent or temporary loss of long-term memory

- Specialty: Neurology

In neurology, retrograde amnesia (RA) is the inability to access memories or information from before an injury or disease occurred. RA differs from a similar condition called anterograde amnesia (AA), which is the inability to form new memories following injury or disease onset. Although an individual can have both RA and AA at the same time, RA can also occur on its own; this 'pure' form of RA can be further divided into three types: focal, isolated, and pure RA. RA negatively affects an individual's episodic, autobiographical, and declarative memory, but they can still form new memories. Furthermore, RA leaves procedural memory intact. Depending on its severity, RA can result in either temporally graded or more permanent memory loss. However, memory loss usually follows Ribot's law, which states that individuals are more likely to lose recent memories than older memories. Diagnosing RA generally requires using an Autobiographical Memory Interview (AMI) and observing brain structure through magnetic resonance imaging (MRI), a computed tomography scan (CT), or electroencephalography (EEG).

== Types ==
Types of RA can be divided into two main categories: temporally graded RA and pure forms of RA. Individuals with pure forms of RA like focal, isolated, and pure RA do not have anterograde amnesia (AA).

=== Temporally graded RA ===
Memory loss in patients with temporally graded RA strongly follows Ribot's law, meaning that one will experience more memory loss for events closer to the injury or disease onset. This type of RA is commonly triggered in individuals with Korsakoff syndrome due to a combination of long-term alcohol use and Wernicke encephalopathy. Debate has risen about why this temporal gradient forms in the first place. Initial theories proposed that the hippocampus and medial temporal lobe are not nearly as important for long-term memories compared to short-term memories. As memory processing occurs in the brain over time, neocortical regions can directly communicate with each other, so they do not rely as heavily on the hippocampus for long-term memory storage. Therefore, if an individual experiences RA that damages the hippocampus, they will lose more short-term memories according to this theory. However, this theory has been challenged by the multiple-trace theory, which claims that the brain develops a hippocampal trace each time a memory is retrieved. Since more hippocampal traces are present for older memories, it is easier for older memories to remain intact when RA occurs.

=== Focal, isolated, and pure RA ===
An absence of anterograde amnesia (AA) characterizes pure forms of RA, which fall into three main categories: focal, isolated, and pure RA. Slight differences in the use of these terms to describe a pure form of RA are summarized below:

Pure Forms of RA
Focal RA	Isolated RA	Pure RA
Focal RA generally results from neurological problems like epilepsy and is characterized by memory loss prior to – but not after – injury or disease onset. When an individual experiences focal RA, a combination of their episodic and semantic memories may be affected. In one case study, a middle-aged woman experienced focal RA after significant head trauma. Although she could be re-taught information from her past, these memories were not episodic, but rather, semantic. With focal RA, the details of a patient's life prior to amnesia onset can be reintroduced, but they are unable to recall how they perceived the experience.	Isolated RA is usually associated with a visible thalamic lesion. Similar to other forms of RA, the inability to recall past information characterizes the isolated form. In one case study, a middle-aged man, identified as JG, had a thalamic lesion which expanded as he grew older. This lesion growth induced his isolated RA, resulting in both autobiographical memory loss and the inability to recognize information from popular culture.	Pure RA (PRA) is caused by a range of factors such as vascular diseases, encephalitis, and head injuries. It is often confused with peritraumatic amnesia that commonly follows mild concussions, but the severity and duration of PRA differs from that of peritraumatic amnesia. Current discussion in neuropsychiatry literature centers on whether PRA is possibly psychogenic in nature.

== Causes ==
RA commonly results from damage to regions of the brain that are associated with episodic and declarative memory, including autobiographical information. In extreme cases, individuals may completely forget who they are. Generally, this is a more severe type of amnesia known as global, or generalized amnesia. However, memory loss can also be selective or categorical, manifested by a person's inability to remember events related to a specific incident or topic. Patients also differ in durations of RA (how long they can't recall information) and durations of what is forgotten (past time frame for which information is unavailable).

During consolidation, the hippocampus acts as an intermediate tool that quickly stores new information until it is transferred to the neocortex for the long-term. The temporal lobe, which holds the hippocampus, entorhinal, perirhinal and parahippocampal cortices, has a reciprocal connection with the neocortex. The temporal lobe is temporarily needed when consolidating new information; as the learning becomes stronger, the neocortex becomes more independent of the temporal lobe.

Studies on specific cases demonstrate how particular impaired areas of the hippocampus are associated with the severity of RA. Damage can be limited to the CA1 field of the hippocampus, causing very limited RA for about one to two years. More extensive damage limited to the hippocampus causes temporally graded amnesia for 15 to 25 years. Another study suggests that large medial temporal lobe lesions, that extend laterally to include other regions, produce more extensive RA, covering 40 to 50 years. These findings suggest that density of RA becomes more severe and long-term as the damage extends beyond the hippocampus to surrounding structures.

=== Traumatic brain injury (TBI) ===
Traumatic brain injury (TBI) occurs from an external force that causes structural damage to the brain, such as a sharp blow to the head, a diffuse axonal injury, or childhood brain damage (e.g., shaken baby syndrome). In cases of sudden rapid acceleration, the brain continues moving around in the skull, harming brain tissue as it hits internal protrusions.

TBI varies according to impact of external forces, location of structural damage, and severity of damage ranging from mild to severe. Retrograde amnesia can be one of the many consequences of brain injury but it is not always the outcome of TBI. An example of a subgroup of people who are often exposed to TBI are individuals who are involved in high-contact sports. Research on football players takes a closer look at some of the implications to their high-contact activities. Enduring consistent head injuries can have an effect on the neural consolidation of memory.

Specific cases, such as that of patient ML, support the evidence that severe blows to the head can cause the onset of RA. In this specific case there was an onset of isolated RA following a severe head injury. The brain damage did not affect the person's ability to form new memories. Therefore, the idea that specific sections of retrograde memory are independent of anterograde is supported. Normally, there is a very gradual recovery, however, a dense period of amnesia immediately preceding the trauma usually persists.

=== Traumatic events ===
RA can occur without any anatomical damage to the brain, lacking an observable neurobiological basis. Primarily referred to as dissociative amnesia or dissociative fugue, it often occurs due to a traumatic situation that individuals wish to consciously or unconsciously avoid through intrapsychic conflicts or unconscious repressions. The onset of dissociative amnesia can be either global (i.e., individual forgets all history) or situation specific (i.e., individual is unable to retrieve memories of specific situations).

Patients experiencing dissociative amnesia have impaired episodic memory, instances of wandering and traveling, and acceptance of a new identity as a result of inaccessible memories pertaining to their previous identity.

Recent research has begun to investigate the effects of stress and fear-inducing situations with the onset of RA. Long-term potentiation (LTP) is the process by which there is a signal transmission between neurons after the activation of a neuron, which has been known to play a strong role in the hippocampus in learning and memory. Common changes in the hippocampus have been found to be related to stress and induced LTP. The commonalities support the idea that variations of stress can play a role in producing new memories as well as the onset of RA for other memories. The amygdala plays a crucial role in memory and can be affected by emotional stimuli, evoking RA.

Studies of specific cases, such as 'AMN', support evidence of traumatic experiences as a plausible cause of RA. AMN escaped a small fire in his house, did not inhale any smoke, and had no brain damage. Nevertheless, he was unable to recall autobiographical knowledge the next day. This case shows that RA can occur in the absence of structural brain damage.

After a traumatic head injury, emotional disturbances can occur at three different levels: neurological, reactionary, and long-term disturbances. Neurological disturbances can change emotional and motivational responses. Reactionary disturbances effect emotional and motivational responses as well, but reflect the failure to cope with environmental demands. Someone with this might withdraw from the environment that they are placed in because they no longer know how to handle the cognitive resources.

=== Nutritional deficiency ===
RA has been found among alcohol-dependent patients who have Korsakoff's syndrome. Korsakoff's syndrome patients develop retrograde amnesia due to a thiamine deficiency (lack of vitamin B1). Also, chronic alcohol use disorders are associated with a decrease in the volume of the left and right hippocampus.

These patients' regular diet consists mostly of hard alcohol intake, which lacks the necessary nutrients for typical development and maintenance. Therefore, after a prolonged time consuming primarily alcohol, these people undergo memory difficulties and ultimately develop RA. However, some of the drawbacks of using Korsakoff patients to study RA is the progressive nature of the illness and the unknown time of onset.

=== Infections ===
Infections that pass the blood–brain barrier can cause brain damage (encephalitis), sometimes resulting in the onset of RA. In the case of patient 'SS', the infection led to focal or isolated retrograde amnesia where there was an absence of or limited AA. Brain scans show abnormalities in the bilateral medial temporal lobes, including two thirds of the hippocampal formation and the posterior part of the amygdala.

=== Surgery ===
Henry Molaison had epilepsy that progressed and worsened by his late twenties. The severity of his condition caused him to undergo surgery in an effort to prevent his seizures. Unfortunately, due to a lack of overall known neurological knowledge, Molaison's surgeons removed his bilateral medial temporal lobe, causing profound AA and RA. The removed brain structures included the hippocampus, the amygdala, and the parahippocampal gyrus, now called the medial temporal lobe memory system. HM was one of the most studied memory cases to date and started the examination of neurological structures in relation to memory.

Patients who have RA due to surgery are "P.B." and "F.C." who had unilateral removal of the medial areas in the left temporal lobe.

=== Controlled induction ===
Clinically induced RA has been achieved using different forms of electrical induction.

- Electroconvulsive therapy (ECT), used as a depression therapy, can cause impairments in memory. Tests show that information from days and weeks before the ECT can be permanently lost. The results of this study also show that severity of RA is more extreme in cases of bilateral ECT rather than unilateral ECT. Impairments can also be more intense if ECT is administered repetitively (sine wave simulation) as opposed to a single pulse (brief-pulse stimulation).
- Electroconvulsive shock (ECS): The research in this field has been advanced by using animals as subjects. This is done to further understand RA.

== Diagnosis ==
Since RA affects people's memories to varying degrees, testing is required to fully diagnose RA; these tests, however, are inherently limited if a patient's previous neuropathological medical history is unknown. As a result, some clinicians diagnose RA by testing patients about factual knowledge, such as current public events. This testing is limited, however, because people's knowledge about current events differs. Furthermore, these tests must be adjusted to account for the time period that a patient is alive, which affects the amount of detail included in the questions. Since some information obtained from this testing is subjective, it is difficult to verify how accurately memories are recalled; this difficulty is especially true for memories from the distant past.

To avoid these issues, many researchers test for RA using the Autobiographical Memory Interview (AMI). The AMI asks patients targeted questions about three different portions of their life: childhood, early adult life, and recent life. For each period of that individual's life, researchers ask questions that require the patient to use either their autobiographical or semantic memory. Through the AMI, researchers can better understand the types of memories affected, as well as the degree of a patient's RA. These AMIs can then be used alongside functional brain imaging techniques like magnetic resonance imaging (MRI), computed tomography scans (CT) and electroencephalography (EEG) that detect brain damage in patients with RA.

== Brain structures ==
The most commonly affected areas are associated with episodic and declarative memory such as the hippocampus, the diencephalon, and the temporal lobes.

- The hippocampus deals largely with memory consolidation, where information from the working memory and short-term memory is encoded into long-term storage for future retrieval. Amnesic patients with damage to the hippocampus are able to demonstrate some degree of unimpaired semantic memory, despite a loss of episodic memory, due to spared parahippocampal cortex. In other words, retrograde amnesics "know" about information or skill, but cannot "remember" how they do.
- The diencephalon and the surrounding areas' role in memory is not well understood. However, this structure appears to be involved in episodic memory recall.
- The temporal lobes are essential for semantic and factual memory processing. Aside from helping to consolidate memory with the hippocampus, the temporal lobes are extremely important for semantic memory. Damage to this region of the brain can result in the impaired organization and categorization of verbal material, disturbance of language comprehension, and impaired long-term memory. The right frontal lobe is critical for the retrieval of episodic information, while the left frontal region is more active for the retrieval of semantic information. Lesions in the right hemisphere and right frontal lobes result in the impaired recall of non-verbal material, such as music and drawings. Difficulties in studying this region of the brain extends to its duties in comprehension, naming objects, verbal memory, and other language functions.

Brain plasticity has helped explain the recovery process of brain damage induced retrograde amnesia, where neuro-structures use different neural pathways to avoid the damaged areas while still performing their tasks. Thus, the brain can learn to be independent of the impaired hippocampus, but only to a certain extent. For example, older memories are consolidated over time and in various structures of the brain, including Wernicke's area and the neocortex, making retrieval through alternate pathways possible.

== Case studies ==
Researchers are interested in examining the effects of disrupted brain areas and conducting experiments for further understanding of a neurotypical brain. Many individuals with brain damage have volunteered to undergo tests to advance scientific knowledge and are traditionally identified in literature by only their initials for confidentiality.

Each case of RA has led to different symptoms and durations, where some patients have exhibited an inability to describe future plans, whether in the near future (e.g., this afternoon) or in the distant future (e.g., next summer) because of their inability to consolidate memories. Furthermore, researchers have also found that some patients can identify themselves and loved ones in photographs, but cannot determine the time or place the photo was taken. It has also been found that patients with RA greatly differ from the general population in remembering past events.

A few case examples are:

- After a head injury, AB had to relearn personal information. Many of AB's habits had also changed.
- Patient CD reported disorientation of place and time following his injuries as well as relearning previously learned information and activities (e.g., using a razor).
- EF was examined and found to be very confused about social norms (e.g., appropriate attire outside his home). EF exhibited memory loss of his personal experiences (e.g., childhood), and the impaired ability to recognize his wife and parents.
- JG is the first recorded patient with isolated RA.
- GH, a mother and a wife, had surgery in August 2002. When GH woke up after the surgery, she believed it was May 1989. Due to her amnesia, GH experienced great difficulty in her social environment, being overwhelmed by relationships to others.
- DH, a learning disabilities instructor and husband, sustained a closed head injury. He did not show any normal signs of memory loss but he could not recall anything prior to the accident.
- CDA is a 20-year-old man who fell and experienced head trauma after being unconscious for a little less than an hour. He had a self-identity loss and a retrograde deficit limited to the autobiographical events 5 years before the trauma. He often showed signs of spontaneous speech that was iterative and sometimes incoherent. When he saw his family and friends, he was shocked at how old they looked because he remembered them from 5 years earlier. This case also included amnesia for procedural skills like the fear of shaving or driving, which ultimately was overcome. There were no psychological, neuropsychological, or brain damage problems. His recovery of memory was progressive and spontaneous, where after several months the amnesia was limited to the two years preceding the trauma. This was a classic case of PRA.
- GC was a 38 year old accountant that was found in a town square unable to remember anything about himself and unaware of where he was and how he got there. He was eventually able to recall basic information about himself and his family, but could not recall emotionally charged autobiographical events pertaining to the last 7 years of his life. Within 3–4 days, it was determined that his autobiographical amnesia was clearly and strictly selective for professional events, as he could remember everything that was not related to his job. It was ultimately learned that the job had created severe emotional stress and anxiety due to the extreme hours that triggered a sudden fugue state. He was eventually able to recover most of his memories minus a single work event where he had stolen money from the company. This was a classic case of psychogenic amnesia.
- AF is a 15-year-old boy who hit his head and lost consciousness. He could not remember anything but was able to play songs on the piano, showing that his procedural memory was still intact. He gradually recovered some memories within the first 2–3 days but had autobiographical amnesia as well as significant memory loss for famous public facts and events for the 2 years prior to the injury.
- L is 19-year-old student who was left with the inability to recall episodic memories after experiencing a fugue state in December 2020. However, he was able to recall things such as his birthday and the street names of Nantes, the city where he resides in. L was part of a case study that associated reduced pupil size as a possible indicator of RA.

Although it may seem that people living with brain damage have great difficulty continuing the usual day-to-day aspects, they still can accomplish many feats. People with RA are able to lead a normal life. For instance, KC is a man who has many functional aspects intact; normal intelligence, unaffected perceptual and linguistic skills, short-term memory, social skills, and reasoning abilities. All of these things are necessary in everyday life and contribute to normal living. KC also is fully capable of scripted activities (e.g., making reservations or changing a flat tire). In addition, patient HC graduated high school and continued into post-secondary studies, an obvious accomplishment despite her condition. DH relearned his childhood memories from his parents and can retell the stories, but cannot recall specifics other than what has been told to him.

== Other forms of amnesia ==
Other forms of amnesia exist and may be confused with RA. For instance, anterograde amnesia (AA) is the inability to learn new information. This describes a problem encoding, storing, or retrieving information that can be used in the future. These two conditions can, and often do, occur in the same patient simultaneously, but are otherwise separate forms of amnesia.

RA can also be an inherent aspect of other forms of amnesia, namely transient global amnesia (TGA). TGA is the sudden onset of AA and RA caused by a traumatic event, however it is short lived, typically lasting only 4 to 8 hours TGA is very difficult to study because of the patients' quick recovery. This form of amnesia, like AA, remains distinct from RA.

Post-traumatic amnesia (PTA) is a state of confusion that occurs immediately following a traumatic brain injury in which the injured person is disoriented and unable to remember events that occur after the injury.

Psychogenic amnesia, or dissociative amnesia, is a memory disorder characterized by sudden retrograde autobiographical memory loss, said to occur for a period of time ranging from hours to years.

== See also ==
- Amnesia
- Anterograde amnesia
- Dissociative amnesia
