= Pill dispenser =

Medical tool

Pill dispensers are items which release medication at specified times, to assist patients in adhering to their prescribed medication regime. They may also alert the patient that it is time to take the medication.

Some devices can alert a monitoring station if the patient does not take the medication from the device promptly.

== See also ==
- Pill organizer
