= Staircase effect =

Staircase effect may refer to:

- Bowditch effect, arising from an increased heart rate
- "Jaggies", artifacts in computer graphics
