= John Harlow =

John Harlow may refer to:

- John Martyn Harlow (1819–1907), American physician to head-injury survivor Phineas Gage
- John Harlow (director) (1896–1977), British film director
- John Harlow, former member of band Coachwhips
