= Phineas Gage =

American brain injury survivor (1823–1860)

Phineas P. Gage
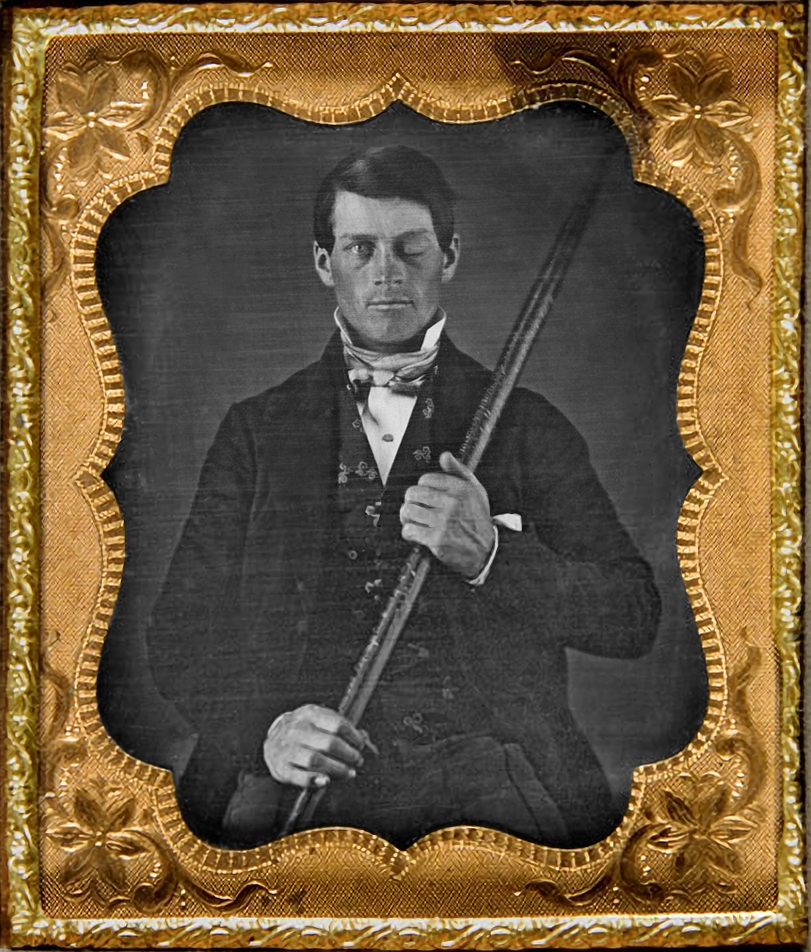
- Gage and his "constant companion"‍—‌his inscribed tamping iron‍—‌sometime after 1849, seen in the portrait (identified in 2009) (Note: The 2009-identified image was, at the time, in the collection of Jack and Beverly Wilgus,^{[T]}^{[W2]}^{[W]}^{[W1]} but in 2016 was donated to the Warren Anatomical Museum. Like almost all daguerreotypes it shows its subject laterally (left–right) reversed, making it appear as if Gage's right eye is injured. However, all Gage's injuries, including to his eye, were on the left; therefore in presenting the image in this article a second, compensating reversal has been applied so as to show Gage as he appeared in life.^{[L]}^{[W]}^{[W1]} The 2010-identified image is in the possession of Tara Gage Miller of Texas; an identical image belongs to Phyllis Gage Hartley of New Jersey.^{[L]} Unlike the Wilgus portrait, which is an original daguerreotype, the Miller and Hartley images are 19th-century photographic reproductions of a common original which remains undiscovered, itself a daguerreotype or other laterally reversing early-process photograph;^{[W1]} here again a compensating reversal has been applied.^{[L]}) that "exploded the common image of Gage as a dirty, disheveled misfit" ^{[K]}
- Born: July 9, 1823 (date uncertain); Grafton County, New Hampshire, (Note: Macmillan^{[M]} discusses Gage's ancestry and early life. The birthdate July 9, 1823, is given by a Gage genealogy without citation,^{[M]} but is consistent with agreement among contemporary sources that Gage was 25 years old on the date of his accident, and with his age (36 years) as given in undertaker's records after his death in May 1860.^{[M]} Possible homes in childhood and youth are Lebanon or nearby East Lebanon, Enfield, and/or Grafton (all in Grafton County, New Hampshire), though Harlow refers to Lebanon in particular as Gage's "native place" ^{[H]} and "his home" ^{[H]} (likely that of his parents),^{[M]} to which Gage returned ten weeks^{[M2]} after his accident. There is nothing to indicate what Gage's middle initial, P, ^{[G1]} stood for.^{[M]} His mother's maiden name is variously given as Swetland, Sweatland, or Sweetland.) U.S.
- Died: May 21, 1860 (aged 36); San Francisco Bay Area, California, U.S.
- Cause of death: Status epilepticus
- Burial place: Cypress Lawn Memorial Park, California (skull in Warren Anatomical Museum, Boston)
- Occupations: Railroad construction foreman; blaster; stagecoach driver
- Known for: Personality change after brain injury
- Spouse: None
- Children: None^{[M]}

Phineas P. Gage (1823–1860) was an American railroad construction foreman remembered for his improbable^{[B1]} survival of an accident in which a large iron rod was driven completely through his head, destroying much of his brain's left frontal lobe, and for that injury's reported effects on his personality and behavior over the remaining 12 years of his life‍—‌effects sufficiently profound that friends saw him (for a time at least) as "no longer Gage".

Long known as the "American Crowbar Case"‍—‌once termed "the case which more than all others is calculated to excite our wonder, impair the value of prognosis, and even to subvert our physiological doctrines" ‍—‌Phineas Gage influenced 19th-century discussion about the mind and brain, particularly debate on cerebral localization,^{[M]}^{[B]} and was perhaps the first case to suggest the brain's role in determining personality, and that damage to specific parts of the brain might induce specific mental changes.

Gage is a fixture in the curricula of neurology, psychology, and neuroscience,^{[M7]} one of "the great medical curiosities of all time"^{[M8]} and "a living part of the medical folklore" ^{[R]} frequently mentioned in books and scientific papers;^{[M]} he even has a minor place in popular culture. (Note: Macmillan (2000), ch. 13; Macmillan (2008), p. 830.) Despite this celebrity, the body of established fact about Gage and what he was like (whether before or after his injury) is small, (Note: Macmillan^{[M]}^{[M2]}^{[M6]} compares accounts of Gage to one another and against the known facts, as well as contrasting Gage's celebrity‍—‌he is mentioned in 91 percent of a sample of introductory psychology textbooks published 2012–2014‍—‌with what was, until comparatively recently, the lack of any major study of him and the dearth of papers solely or mainly about him.^{[M]} Until 2008^{[M10]}^{[M1]} the available primary sources offering significant information on Gage, and for which there is any evidence at all (even merely the source's own claim) of contact with Gage or his family, were limited to Harlow (1848, 1849, 1868);^{[H1]}^{[H2]}^{[H]} Bigelow (1850);^{[B1]} and Jackson (1849, 1870). Macmillan notes that descriptions of Gage's behavior‍—‌the source of the perennial interest in the case‍—‌total just 300 words^{[M]} and emphasizes the primacy of Harlow's three publications as sources.^{[M]} (Harlow's original case notes have not been located.^{[M]} A Warren Museum curator referred to the "stately elegance" of Harlow's writings on Gage.) However, all of these sources were difficult to obtain prior to 2000‍—‌for example, Macmillan was able to identify only 21 copies of Harlow's 1868 paper in US libraries^{[M]}‍—‌and Macmillan believes this has helped allow distorted descriptions of Gage to flourish.^{[M1]} Macmillan & Lena^{[M10]} present previously unknown sources found since 2008.) which has allowed "the fitting of almost any theory [desired] to the small number of facts we have" ^{[M]}‍—‌Gage acting as a "Rorschach inkblot" in which proponents of various conflicting theories of the brain all saw support for their views. Historically, both scientific and popular accounts of Gage have almost always severely exaggerated and distorted his behavioral changes, frequently contradicting the known facts.

A report of Gage's physical and mental condition shortly before his death implies that his most serious mental changes were temporary, so that in later life he was far more functional, and socially far better adapted, than in the years immediately following his accident. A social recovery hypothesis suggests that his work as a stagecoach driver in Chile fostered this recovery by providing daily structure that allowed him to regain lost social and personal skills.

== Life ==
=== Background ===
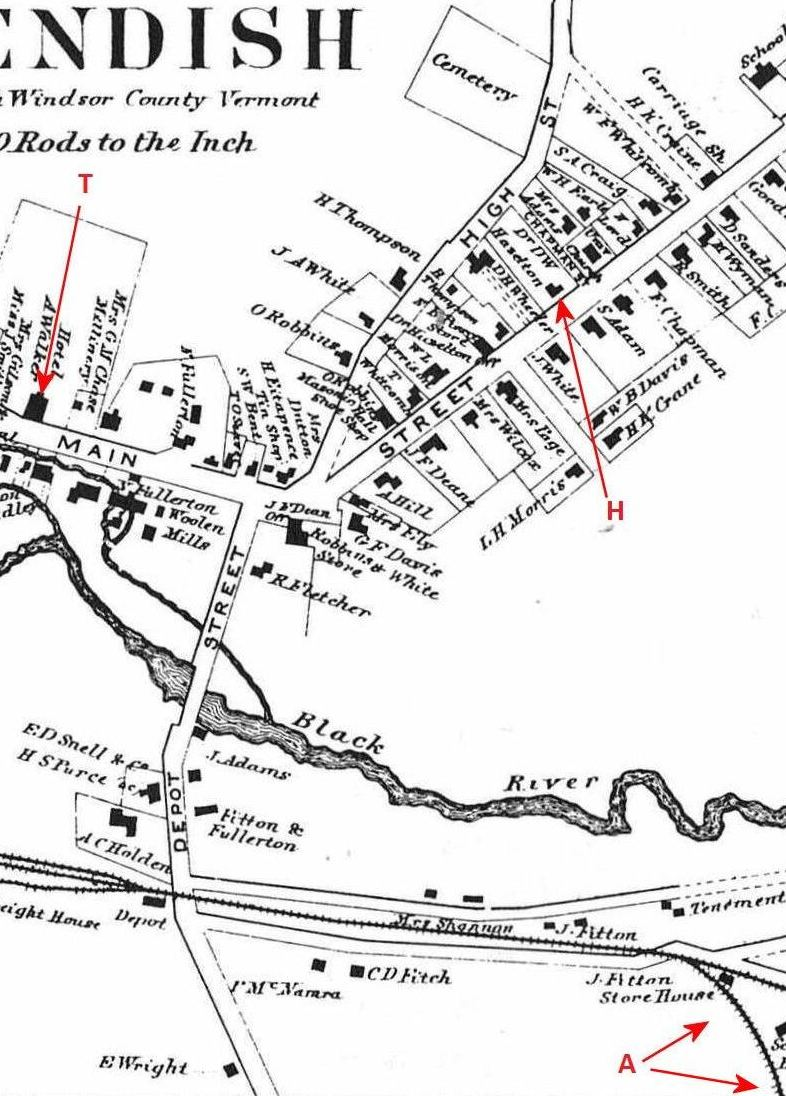
Cavendish, Vermont, 20 years after Gage's accident: (a) Region of the accident site (exact location uncertain); (t) Gage's lodgings, to which he was taken after his injury; (h) Harlow's home and surgery. (Note: Macmillan gives background on the location and circumstances of the accident, and the steps in setting a blast. The village of Cavendish (part of the town of Cavendish) was at the time called Duttonsville. The blast hole, about 1 3/4 inches (4.5 cm) in diameter and up to 12 feet (4 m) deep, might require three men working as much as a day to bore using hand tools. The labor invested in setting each blast, the judgment involved in selecting its location and the quantity of powder to be used, and the often explosive nature of employer-employee relations on this type of job, all underscore the significance of Harlow's statements that Gage had been a "great favorite" with his men, and that his employers had considered him "the most efficient and capable foreman in their employ" prior to the accident.^{[M]}^{[M7]}^{[M2]})

Gage was the first of five children born to Jesse Eaton Gage and Hannah Trussell Gage (née Swetland) of Grafton County, New Hampshire. Little is known about his upbringing and education beyond that he was literate.^{[M]}^{[M10]}

Physician John Martyn Harlow, who knew Gage before his accident, described him as

a perfectly healthy, strong and active young man, twenty-five years of age, nervo-bilious temperament, five feet six inches [168 cm] in height, average weight one hundred and fifty pounds [68 kg], possessing an iron will as well as an iron frame; muscular system unusually well developed‍—‌having had scarcely a day's illness from his childhood to the date of [his] injury.^{[H]}

(In the pseudoscience of phrenology, which was then just ending its vogue, nervo-bilious denoted an unusual combination of "excitable and active mental powers" with "energy and strength [of] mind and body [making] possible the endurance of great mental and physical labor".)^{[M]}

Gage may have first worked with explosives on farms as a youth, or in nearby mines and quarries.^{[M]} In July 1848 he was employed on construction of the Hudson River Railroad near Cortlandt Town, New York,^{[M10]} and by September he was a blasting foreman (possibly an independent contractor) on railway construction projects.^{[M]} His employers' "most efficient and capable foreman ... a shrewd, smart business man, very energetic and persistent in executing all his plans of operation",^{[H]} he had even commissioned a custom-made tamping iron‍—‌a large iron rod‍—‌for use in setting explosive charges.^{[B1]}^{[M]}

=== Accident ===
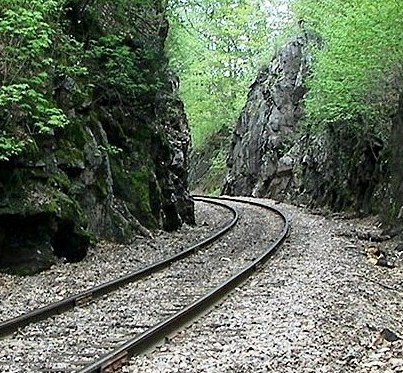
Line of the Rutland & Burlington Railroad passing through "cut" in rock south of Cavendish. Gage met with his accident while setting explosives to create either this cut or a similar one nearby.

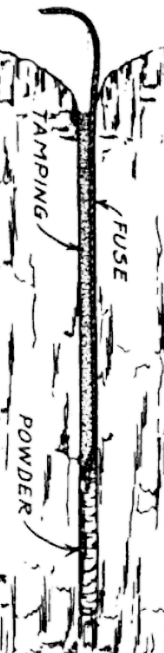
Explosive charge ready for fuse to be lit. tamping (sand or clay) directs blast into surrounding rock.

On September 13, 1848, Gage was directing a work gang blasting rock while preparing the roadbed for the Rutland & Burlington Railroad south of the village of Cavendish, Vermont. Setting a blast entailed boring a hole deep into an outcrop of rock; adding blasting powder and a fuse; then using the tamping iron to pack ("tamp") sand, clay, or other inert material into the hole above the powder in order to contain the blast's energy and direct it into surrounding rock.

The left frontal lobe (red), with Ratiu et al.'s estimate of the iron's path^{[R1]}

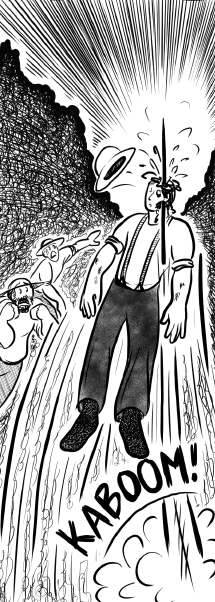
Panel from Bring Me the Head of Phineas Gage, a portrayal of Gage in popular culture

As Gage was doing this around 4:30 p.m., his attention was attracted by his men working behind him. Looking over his right shoulder, and inadvertently bringing his head into line with the blast hole and tamping iron, Gage opened his mouth to speak; at that same instant the tamping iron sparked against the rock and (possibly because the sand had been omitted) the powder prematurely exploded. Rocketed from the hole, the tamping iron‍—‌1 1/4 inches (3.2 cm) in diameter, three feet seven inches (1.1 m) long, and weighing 13 1/4 pounds (6.0 kg)‍—‌entered the left side of Gage's face in an upward direction, just forward of the angle of the lower jaw. Continuing upward outside the upper jaw and possibly fracturing the cheekbone, it passed behind the left eye, through the left side of the brain, then completely out the top of the skull through the frontal bone.^{[B1]}^{[H]}^{[M]}

Despite 19th-century references to Gage as the "American Crowbar Case", (Note: ^{[T2]} Barker: "Harlow always refers to the bar by its proper title, as a tamping iron. Bigelow's reference to a crowbar ... gave the case its nickname, which is still encountered today." ^{[B]}) his tamping iron did not have the bend or claw sometimes associated with the term crowbar; rather, it was simply a pointed cylinder something like a javelin,^{[K]} round and fairly smooth:^{[H]}

The end which entered [Gage's cheek] first is pointed; the taper being [eleven inches (28 cm) long, ending in a 1/4-inch (0.5 cm) point] ^{[V]}... circumstances to which the patient perhaps owes his life. The iron is unlike any other, and was made by a neighbouring blacksmith to please the fancy of the owner.^{[B1]}

The tamping iron landed point-first some 80 feet (25 m) away,^{[M]} "smeared with blood and brain".^{[H]}

Gage was thrown onto his back and gave some brief convulsions of the arms and legs, but spoke within a few minutes, walked with little assistance, and sat upright in an oxcart for the 3/4-mile (1.2 km) ride to his lodgings in town.^{[H]} (A possibly apocryphal contemporary newspaper report claimed that Gage, while en route, made an entry in his time-book‍—‌the record of his crew's hours and wages.)^{[L1]} About 30 minutes after the accident, physician Edward H. Williams found Gage sitting in a chair outside the hotel and was greeted with "one of the great understatements of medical history":^{[M5]}

When I drove up he said, "Doctor, here is business enough for you." I first noticed the wound upon the head before I alighted from my carriage, the pulsations of the brain being very distinct. The top of the head appeared somewhat like an inverted funnel, as if some wedge-shaped body had passed from below upward. Mr. Gage, during the time I was examining this wound, was relating the manner in which he was injured to the bystanders. I did not believe Mr. Gage's statement at that time, but thought he was deceived. Mr. Gage persisted in saying that the bar went through his head. Mr. G. got up and vomited; the effort of vomiting pressed out about half a teacupful of the brain [through the exit hole at the top of the skull], which fell upon the floor.

Harlow took charge of the case around 6 p.m.:

You will excuse me for remarking here, that the picture presented was, to one unaccustomed to military surgery, truly terrific; but the patient bore his sufferings with the most heroic firmness. He recognized me at once, and said he hoped he was not much hurt. He seemed to be perfectly conscious, but was getting exhausted from the hemorrhage. His person, and the bed on which he was laid, were literally one gore of blood.

Gage was also swallowing blood, which he regurgitated every 15 or 20 minutes.

=== Treatment and convalescence ===
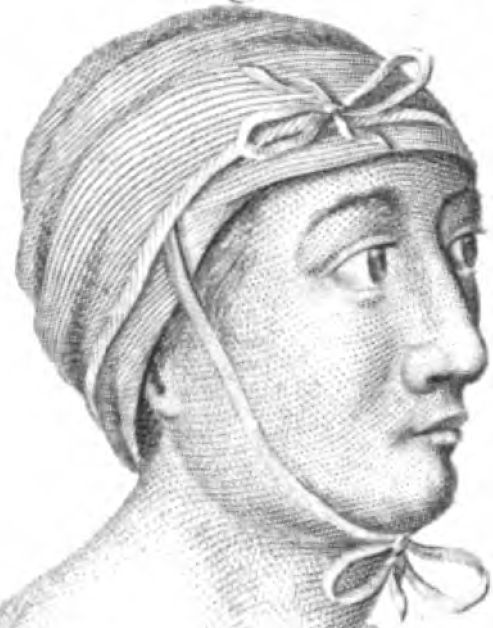
A nightcap used as a bandage

With Williams' assistance (Note: Williams family lore holds that Harlow did not appear on the scene until two days after Gage's accident, but nonetheless "sought eventually to take the whole glory of the successful outcome" of the case, even though Williams "was given full credit by all those who knew of his connection" to it. However, these stories conflict with every other account of the case, including Williams' own.^{[M]}) Harlow shaved the scalp around the region of the tamping iron's exit, then removed coagulated blood, small bone fragments, and "an ounce or more" of protruding brain. After probing for foreign bodies and replacing two large detached pieces of bone, Harlow closed the wound with adhesive straps, leaving it partially open for drainage;^{[M]} the entrance wound in the cheek was bandaged only loosely, for the same reason. A wet compress was applied, then a nightcap, then further bandaging to secure these dressings. Harlow also dressed Gage's hands and forearms (which along with his face had been deeply burned) and ordered that Gage's head be kept elevated.

Late that evening Harlow noted, "Mind clear. Constant agitation of his legs, being alternately retracted and extended ... Says he 'does not care to see his friends, as he shall be at work in a few days.'"

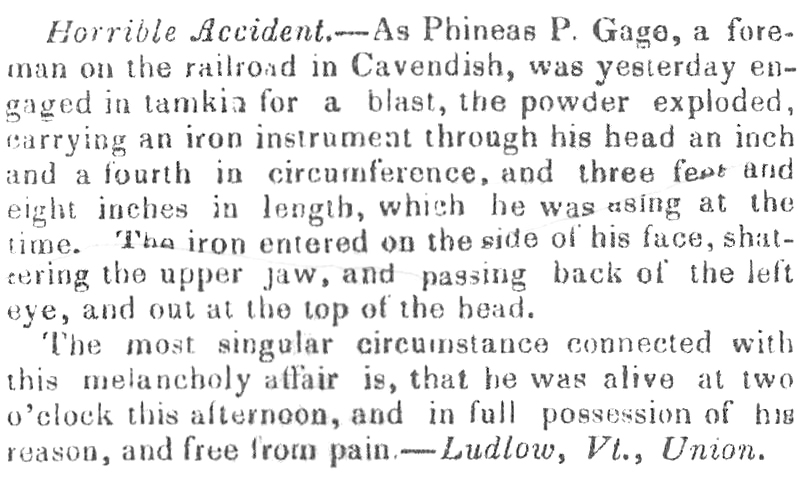
The first known report of Gage's accident, understating the thickness of his tamping iron (by confusing its diameter with its circumference) and overstating the iron's length and the damage to Gage's jaw.^{[M]} "[Gage's] fame is of the kind that is, and in his case literally so, thrust upon otherwise ordinary people", writes Malcolm Macmillan.^{[M]}

Despite his own optimism, Gage's convalescence was long, difficult, and uneven. Though recognizing his mother and uncle—summoned from Lebanon, New Hampshire, 30 miles (50 km) away‍—‌^{[H]}^{[M]} on the morning after the accident, on the second day he "lost control of his mind, and became decidedly delirious". By the fourth day, he was again "rational ... knows his friends", and after a week's further improvement Harlow entertained, for the first time, the thought "that it was possible for Gage to recover ... This improvement, however, was of short duration."

The entry damage to Gage's left cheek, and the raised bone fragment in the exit area above his forehead, are visible in this plaster cast taken in late 1849. (Note: ^{[B1]}^{[M]} The head cast, taken from life, is often mistakenly referred to as a death mask.^{[M2]})

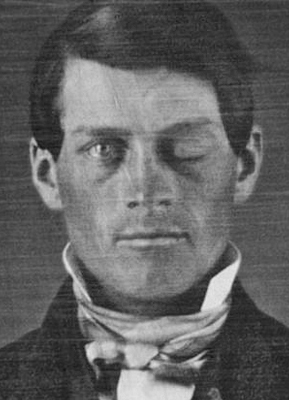
"Disfigured yet still handsome".^{[T]} Note ptosis of the left eye and scar on forehead.

Beginning 12 days after the accident,^{[M]} Gage was semi-comatose, "seldom speaking unless spoken to, and then answering only in monosyllables", and on the 13th day Harlow noted, "Failing strength ... coma deepened; the globe of the left eye became more protuberant, with ["fungus"‍—‌deteriorated, infected tissue]^{[M]} pushing out rapidly from the internal canthus [as well as] from the wounded brain, and coming out at the top of the head." By the 14th day, "the exhalations from the mouth and head [are] horribly fetid. Comatose, but will answer in monosyllables if aroused. Will not take nourishment unless strongly urged. The friends and attendants are in hourly expectancy of his death, and have his coffin and clothes in readiness. One of the attendants implored me not to do anything more for him, as it would only prolong his sufferings—that if I would only keep away and let him alone, he would die."

Galvanized to action, Harlow "cut off the fungi which were sprouting out from the top of the brain and filling the opening, and made free application of caustic [i.e. crystalline silver nitrate]^{[M]}^{[H1]} to them. With a scalpel I laid open the [frontalis muscle, from the exit wound down to the top of the nose]^{[H1]} and immediately there were discharged eight ounces [250 ml] of ill-conditioned pus, with blood, and excessively fetid." ("Gage was lucky to encounter Dr. Harlow when he did", writes Barker. "Few doctors in 1848 would have had the experience with cerebral abscess with which Harlow left [Jefferson Medical College] and which probably saved Gage's life." ^{[B]} See § Factors favoring Gage's survival, below.)

On the 24th day, Gage "succeeded in raising himself up, and took one step to his chair". One month later, he was walking "up and down stairs, and about the house, into the piazza", and while Harlow was absent for a week Gage was "in the street every day except Sunday", his desire to return to his family in New Hampshire being "uncontrollable by his friends ... he went without an overcoat and with thin boots; got wet feet and a chill". He soon developed a fever, but by mid-November was "feeling better in every respect [and] walking about the house again". Harlow's prognosis at this point: Gage "appears to be in a way of recovering, if he can be controlled".

By November 25 (10 weeks after his injury), Gage was strong enough to return to his parents' home in Lebanon, New Hampshire, traveling there in a "close carriage" (an enclosed conveyance of the kind used for transporting the insane).^{[H]}^{[M]} Though "quite feeble and thin ... weak and childish"^{[M]} on arriving, by late December he was "riding out, improving both mentally and physically",^{[H2]} and by the following February he was "able to do a little work about the horses and barn, feeding the cattle etc. [and] as the time for ploughing came [i.e. about May or June] he was able to do half a day's work after that and bore it well". In August his mother told an inquiring physician that Gage's memory seemed somewhat impaired, though slightly enough that a stranger would not notice. (Note: ^{[M]} Macmillan^{[M]} speculates that memory impairment may have been the interpretation placed by Gage's family on his difficulty, as reported by Harlow, in concentrating on tasks)

=== Injuries ===
In April 1849, Gage returned to Cavendish and visited Harlow, who noted at that time loss of vision, and ptosis, of the left eye, (Note: Though the tamping iron's passage forced the left eye from its orbit by one-half its diameter, that eye retained "indistinct" vision until the tenth day after the accident, when vision was permanently lost.^{[H]} Ratiu et al. conclude that "the optic canal was spared ... [the vision loss being] secondary to acute glaucoma or swelling of the optic nerve and compression against the rigid walls of the optic canal".^{[R]} Harlow added that Gage could "adduct and depress the globe, but [not] move it in any other direction".) a large scar on the forehead (from Harlow's draining of the abscess)^{[H1]} and

upon the top of the head ... a quadrangular fragment of bone ... raised and quite prominent. Behind this is a deep depression, two inches by one and one-half inches [5 by 4 cm] wide, beneath which the pulsations of the brain can be perceived. Partial paralysis of the left side of the face. His physical health is good, and I am inclined to say he has recovered. Has no pain in head, but says it has a queer feeling which he is not able to describe.^{[H]}

Gage's rearmost left upper molar, adjacent to the point of entry through the cheek, was also lost. (Note: Osteological examination of the tooth socket confirms that this tooth was lost before Gage died, though it is unknown when; presumably it was either knocked out during the accident, or loosened so that it fell out later.^{[V]}) Though a year later some weakness remained,^{[M]} Harlow wrote that "physically, the recovery was quite complete during the four years immediately succeeding the injury".^{[H]}

=== New England and New York (1849–1852) ===
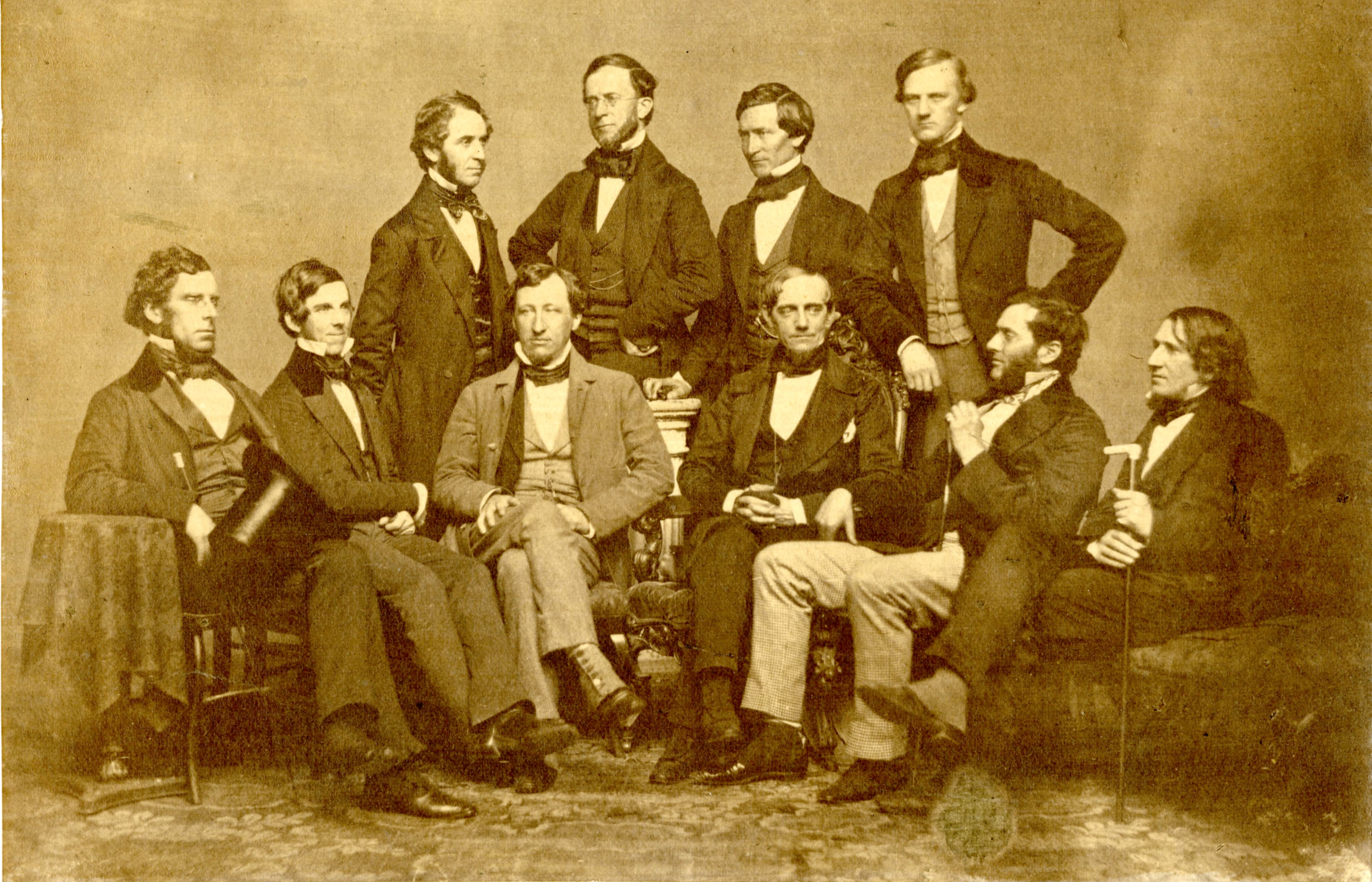
Bigelow presented Gage to the elite Boston Society for Medical Improvement in 1849. In this 1853 Society portrait, Oliver Wendell Holmes is seated second from left.

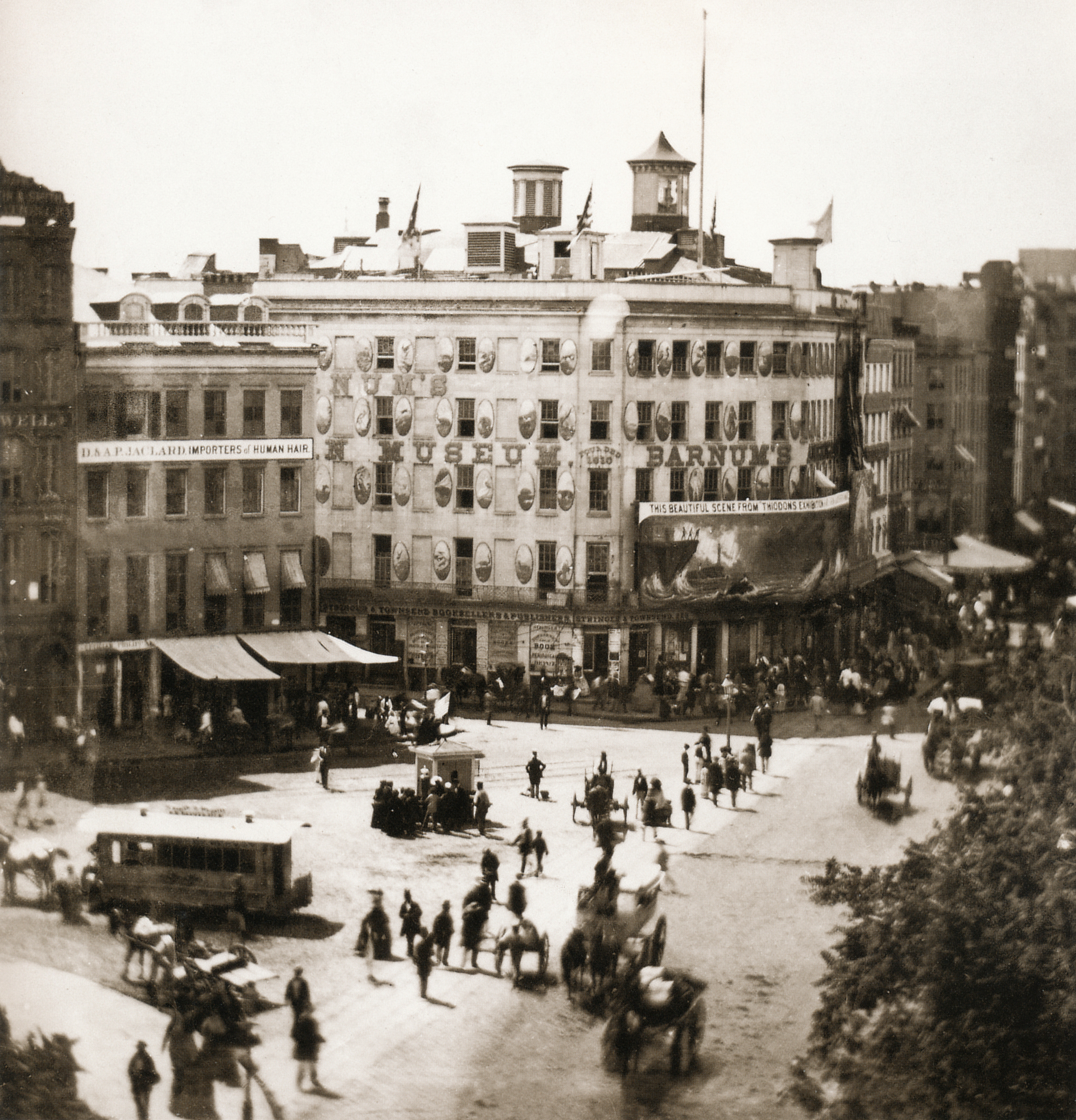
For a time Gage was "a kind of living museum exhibit" at Barnum's American Museum in New York City.

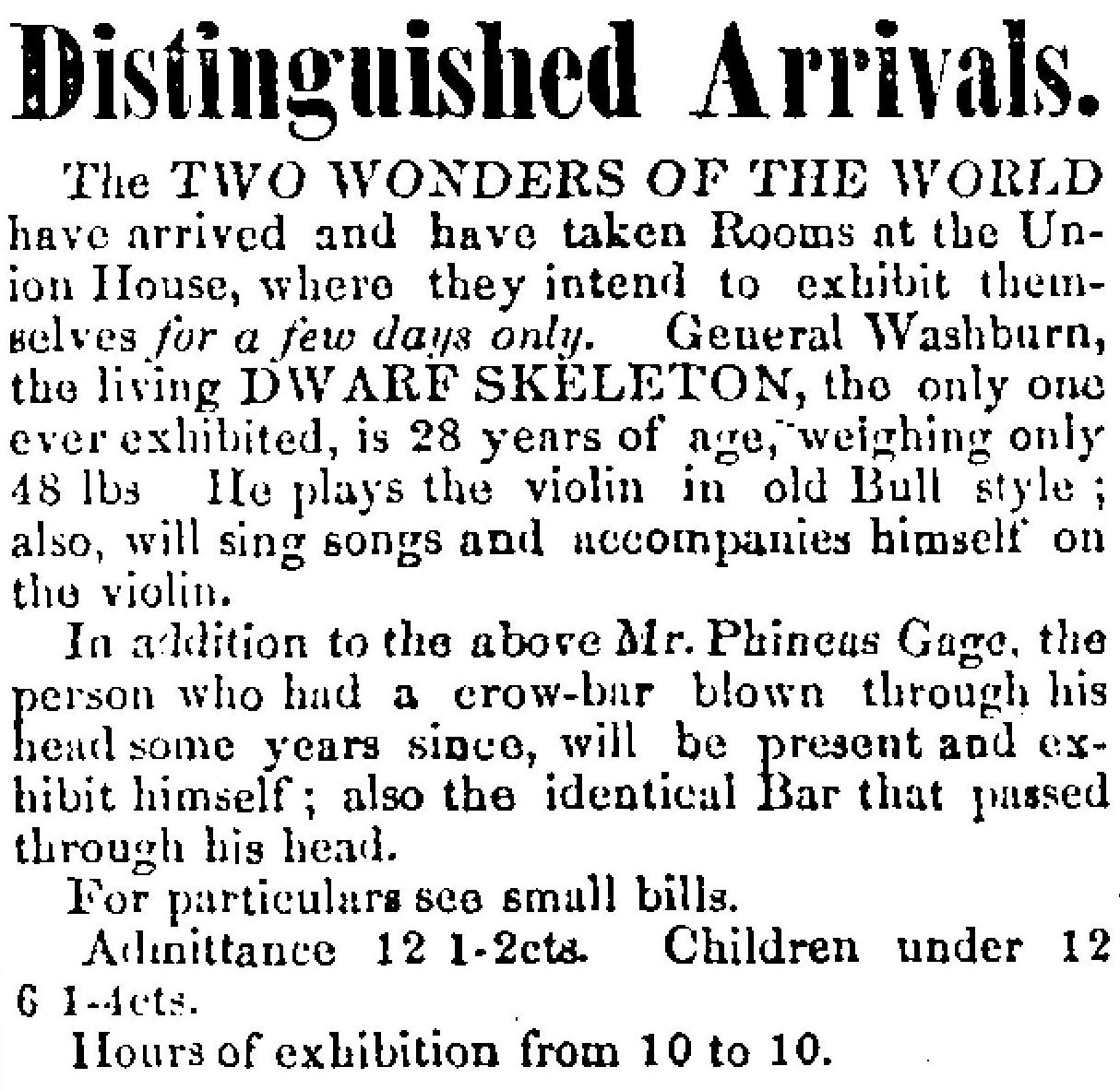
"Admittance 12 1/2 cents" (equivalent to about $5 in 2025). Gage briefly resumed exhibiting just before going to Chile, possibly to help finance that move; this advertisement appeared August 1852 in Montpelier, Vermont.^{[L1]}

In November 1849 Henry Jacob Bigelow, the Professor of Surgery at Harvard Medical School,^{[M1]} brought Gage to Boston for several weeks and, after satisfying himself that the tamping iron had actually passed through Gage's head, presented him to a meeting of the Boston Society for Medical Improvement and (possibly) to the medical school class.^{[B1]}^{[M]} (Note: Gage may have been one of the earliest examples of a patient entering a hospital primarily to further medical research rather than for treatment. He also appears to have been one of the first patients exhibited in an entertainment venue, as opposed to in presentations before medical audiences.^{[M1]})

Unable to reclaim his railroad job Gage was for a time "a kind of living museum exhibit" at Barnum's American Museum in New York City. (This was not the later Barnum's circus; there is no evidence Gage ever exhibited with a troupe or circus, or on a fairground.) (Note: Bigelow (1868); Harlow (1868), p. 14; Macmillan (2000), pp. 14,98–99; Macmillan & Lena, pp. 643–44.) Advertisements have also been found for public appearances by Gage‍—‌which he may have arranged and promoted himself‍—‌in New Hampshire and Vermont,^{[M10]} supporting Harlow's statement that Gage made public appearances in "most of the larger New England towns".^{[H]}^{[M1]} (Years later Bigelow wrote that Gage had been "a shrewd and intelligent man and quite disposed to do anything of that sort to turn an honest penny", but gave up such efforts because "[that] sort of thing has not much interest for the general public".)^{[B2]}^{[M10]} For about 18 months, he worked for the owner of a stable and coach service in Hanover, New Hampshire.^{[H]}^{[M]}

=== Chile and California (1852–1860) ===
Phineas was accustomed to entertain his little nephews and nieces with the most fabulous recitals of his wonderful feats and hair-breadth escapes, without any foundation except in his fancy. He conceived a great fondness for pets and souvenirs, especially for children, horses and dogs‍—‌only exceeded by his attachment for his tamping iron, which was his constant companion during the remainder of his life.

— J. M. Harlow (1868)^{[H]}

In August 1852, Gage was invited to Chile to work as a long-distance stagecoach driver there, "caring for horses, and often driving a coach heavily laden and drawn by six horses" on the Valparaíso–Santiago route.^{[M]}^{[H]} After his health began to fail in mid-1859,^{[H]} (Note: Gage's death and original burial are discussed by Macmillan.^{[M]}^{[M2]} Harlow gives Gage's date of death as May 21, 1861,^{[H]} but because bound, consecutive interment records show that Gage was buried May 23, 1860,^{[M]} Macmillan concludes that May 21, 1860 is the correct death date;^{[M]}^{[M10]} this is confirmed by a contemporary obituary. (Harlow's informant was Gage's mother;^{[H]}^{[M10]} Macmillan^{[M]} points out that the 1861 date, when combined with Gage's recorded age at death‍—‌36 years plus an unspecified number of months‍—‌obscures the fact that Gage was born just a few months after his parents' April 27, 1823 marriage.) This implies that certain other dates Harlow gives for events late in Gage's life‍—‌his move from Chile to San Francisco and the onset of his convulsions‍—‌must also be mistaken, presumably by the same one year; this article follows Macmillan^{[M]} in correcting those dates, each of which carries this annotation.) he left Chile for San Francisco, arriving (in his mother's words) "in a feeble condition, having failed very much since he left New Hampshire ... Had many ill turns while in Valparaiso, especially during the last year, and suffered much from hardship and exposure." In San Francisco he recovered under the care of his mother and sister,^{[H]} who had relocated there from New Hampshire around the time he went to Chile.^{[M]} Then, "anxious to work", he found employment with a farmer in Santa Clara.^{[H]}

In February 1860, Gage began to have epileptic seizures. He lost his job, and (wrote Harlow) as the seizures increased in frequency and severity he "continued to work in various places [though he] could not do much".^{[M]}^{[H]}

=== Death and exhumation ===
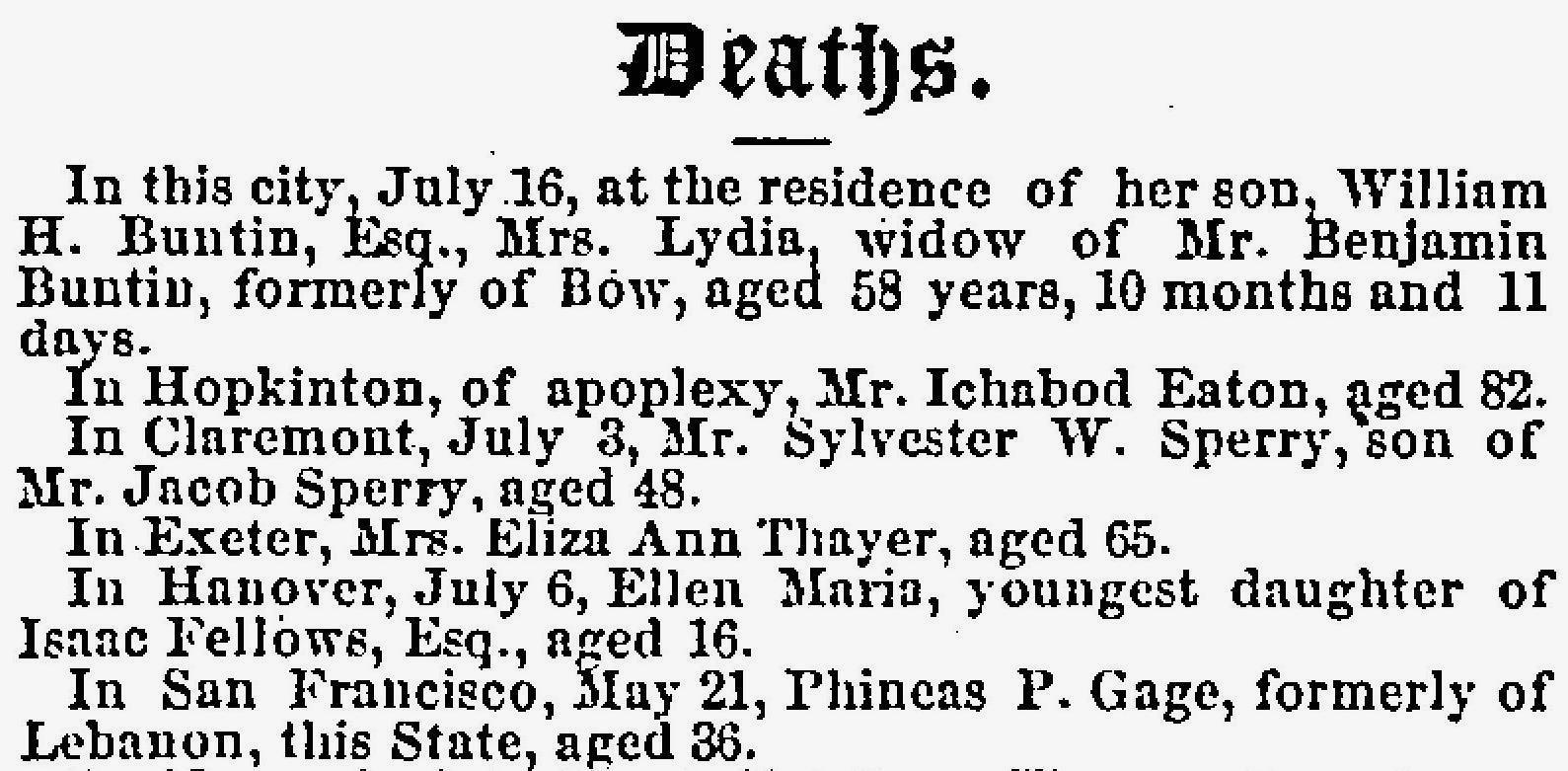
New Hampshire Statesman, July 21, 1860

On May 18, 1860, Gage "left Santa Clara and went home to his mother. At 5 o'clock, A.M., on the 20th, he had a severe convulsion. The family physician was called in, and bled him. The convulsions were repeated frequently during the succeeding day and night," ^{[H]} and he died in status epilepticus,^{[M2]} in or near San Francisco, (Note: Where precisely Gage died is uncertain. Harlow states that Gage "went home to his mother" three days before he died, but the US census for June 1, 1860 (seven days after Gage's death) lists as empty the San Francisco house shared by Hannah Gage, her daughter (Gage's sister) Phebe, Phebe's husband David Dustin Shattuck, and Phebe and David's young son Frank. Instead, Hannah, Phebe, and Frank (but not D. D. Shattuck, who sometimes traveled on business) were listed as living in the home of physician William Jackson Wentworth, across San Francisco Bay in what is now Oakland. The family's connection to Wentworth is unknown, but it may be related to the fact that Frank was deaf; it is also possible Wentworth had met Gage during Gage's visit to Boston in 1849.^{[M2]}^{[L1]}) late on May 21, 1860. He was buried in San Francisco's Lone Mountain Cemetery.

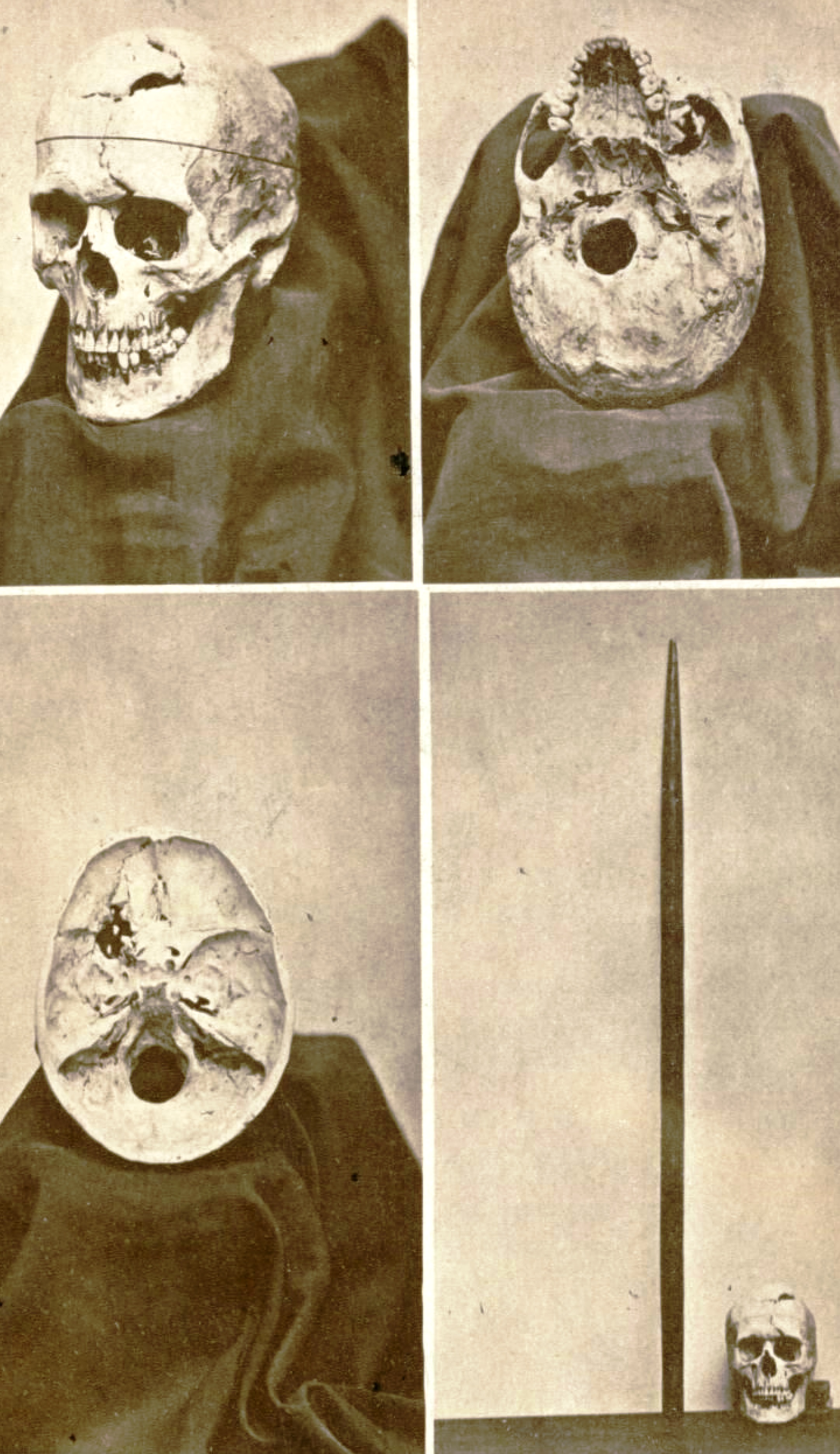
"[T]he mother and friends, waiving the claims of personal and private affection, with a magnanimity more than praiseworthy, at my request have cheerfully placed this skull in my hands, for the benefit of science." Gage's skull (sawed to show interior) and iron, photographed for Harlow in 1868. (Note: Harlow (1868), p. 21; Macmillan (2000), pp. 26, 115, 479–80)

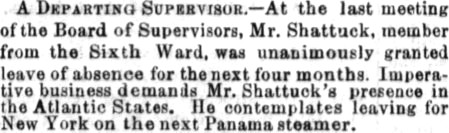
Gage's brother-in-law (a San Francisco city official) and his family personally delivered Gage's skull and iron to Harlow.^{[M10]}

In 1866, Harlow (who had "lost all trace of [Gage], and had well nigh abandoned all expectation of ever hearing from him again") somehow learned that Gage had died in California, and made contact with his family there. At Harlow's request the family had Gage's skull exhumed, then personally delivered it to Harlow,^{[M]}^{[H]}^{[M10]} who was by then a prominent physician, businessman, and civic leader in Woburn, Massachusetts.^{[M]}^{[M7]}

About a year after the accident, Gage had given his tamping iron to Harvard Medical School's Warren Anatomical Museum, but he later reclaimed it^{[B1]}^{[M]} and made what he called "my iron bar" ^{[M10]}^{[G1]} his "constant companion during the remainder of his life"; (Note: ^{[H]} The tamping iron appears to have passed between the Warren Museum and Gage several times. Gage originally gave it to the Museum in early 1850, yet he had it with him when he briefly resumed exhibiting just before going to Chile in 1852. Two years later he was asking for it again: the Museum's files hold a note reading, "3106 • Mr. B. R. Sweatland • Please deliver my iron bar to the bearer • P. P. Gage • Aug 26th, [18]54". Benjamin Richards Sweetland (or Sweatland), a second cousin of Gage's mother, emigrated from New York to California in the 1850s. Presumably Gage either gave or sent this note to Sweetland, who used it to retrieve from the Museum the tamping iron, which he then took, or forwarded, to Gage in Valparaiso. The 3106, in a different hand, is the tamping iron's number in J.B.S. Jackson's 1870 catalog of the Museum.^{[L1]}^{[G1]}) now it too was delivered by Gage's family to Harlow.^{[M10]} (Though some accounts assert that Gage's iron had been buried with him, there is no evidence for this.)^{[M10]}^{[L1]} After studying them for a triumphal^{[L1]} 1868 retrospective paper on Gage,^{[H]} Harlow redeposited the iron‍—‌this time with Gage's skull‍—‌in the Warren Museum, where they remain on display today.

The tamping iron bears the following inscription, commissioned by Bigelow in conjunction with the iron's original deposit in the Museum (though the date given for the accident is one day off):

This is the bar that was shot through the head of Mr Phinehas^{[sic]} P. Gage at Cavendish Vermont Sept 14,^{[sic]} 1848. He fully recovered from the injury & deposited this bar in the Museum of the Medical College of Harvard University. • Phinehas P. Gage • Lebanon Grafton Cy N–H • Jan 6 1850

The date Jan 6 1850 falls within the period during which Gage was in Boston under Bigelow's observation.^{[B1]}^{[H]}^{[M]}

In 1940 Gage's headless remains were moved to Cypress Lawn Memorial Park as part of a mandated relocation of San Francisco's cemeteries to outside city limits.^{[M]}

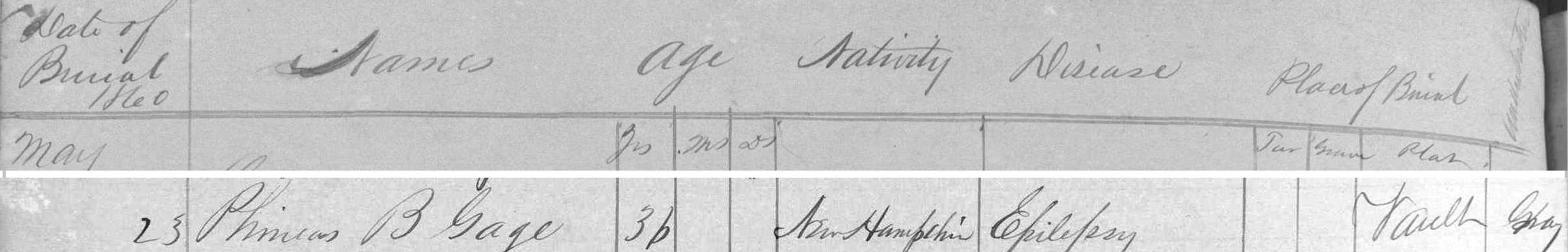
Excerpt from record book, Lone Mountain Cemetery, San Francisco, reflecting the May 23, 1860, interment of Phineas B.^{[sic]} Gage by undertakers N. Gray & Co. (Position pointer over writing for transcription; click for full page.)

== Mental changes and brain damage ==
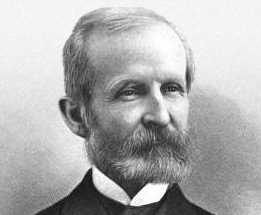
"I dressed him, God healed him", wrote physician J. M. Harlow, who attended Gage after the "rude missile had been shot through his brain" and obtained his skull for study after his death. Shown here in later life, Harlow's interest in phrenology prepared him to accept that Gage's injury had changed his behavior. (Note: Harlow (1868), p. 20; Barker, p. 672)

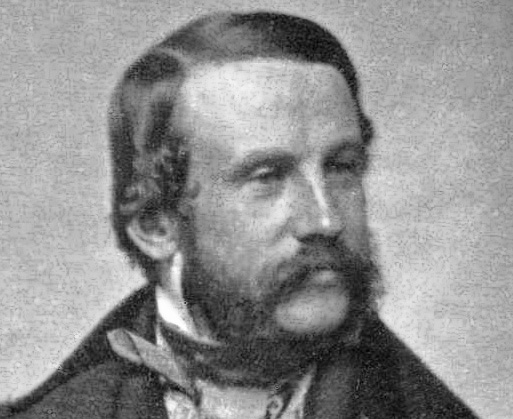
"The leading feature of this case is its improbability", wrote Harvard's Prof. H. J. Bigelow (seen here in 1854). His anti-localizationist training predisposed him to minimize Gage's behavioral changes.^{[B]}

Gage may have been the first case to suggest the brain's role in determining personality and that damage to specific parts of the brain might induce specific personality changes, (Note: ^{[M]}^{[M2]}^{[K2]}) but the nature, extent, and duration of these changes have been difficult to establish.^{[M]}^{[M10]} Only a handful of sources give direct information on what Gage was like (either before or after the accident), the mental changes published after his death were much more dramatic than anything reported while he was alive,^{[M]} and few sources are explicit about the periods of Gage's life to which their various descriptions of him (which vary widely in their implied level of functional impairment) are meant to apply.^{[M10]}

=== Early observations (1849–1852) ===
Harlow ("virtually our only source of information" on Gage, according to psychologist Malcolm Macmillan)^{[M]} described the pre-accident Gage as hard-working, responsible, and "a great favorite" with the men in his charge, his employers having regarded him as "the most efficient and capable foreman in their employ"; he also took pains to note that Gage's memory and general intelligence seemed unimpaired after the accident, outside of the delirium exhibited in the first few days.^{[M]} Nonetheless these same employers, after Gage's accident, "considered the change in his mind so marked that they could not give him his place again":

The equilibrium or balance, so to speak, between his intellectual faculties and animal propensities, seems to have been destroyed. He is fitful, irreverent, indulging at times in the grossest profanity (which was not previously his custom), manifesting but little deference for his fellows, impatient of restraint or advice when it conflicts with his desires, at times pertinaciously obstinate, yet capricious and vacillating, devising many plans of future operations, which are no sooner arranged than they are abandoned in turn for others appearing more feasible. A child in his intellectual capacity and manifestations, he has the animal passions of a strong man. Previous to his injury, although untrained in the schools, he possessed a well-balanced mind, and was looked upon by those who knew him as a shrewd, smart business man, very energetic and persistent in executing all his plans of operation. In this regard his mind was radically changed, so decidedly that his friends and acquaintances said he was "no longer Gage."^{[H]}

This description ("now routinely quoted", says Kotowicz)^{[K2]} is from Harlow's observations set down soon after the accident,^{[M]}^{[M10]} but Harlow‍—‌perhaps hesitant to describe his patient negatively while he was still alive^{[M]}‍—‌delayed publishing it until 1868, after Gage had died and his family had supplied "what we so much desired to see" (as Harlow termed Gage's skull).^{[H]}

In the interim, an 1848 discussion of Gage by Harlow‍—‌published just as Gage was emerging from his convalescence‍—‌had merely hinted at psychological symptoms:^{[M]}

The mental manifestations of the patient, I reserve to a future communication. I think the case ... is exceedingly interesting to the enlightened physiologist and intellectual philosopher.^{[H1]}

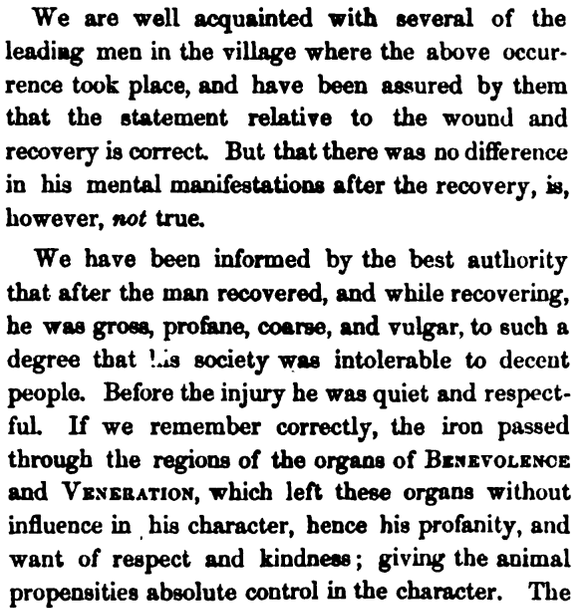
"Before the injury he was quiet and respectful." 1851 report, apparently based on information from Harlow, countering Bigelow's claim that Gage was mentally unchanged. The "organs of Benevolence and Veneration" are the regions of the brain responsible, in the pseudoscience of phrenology, for those character traits.

But after Bigelow termed Gage "quite recovered in faculties of body and mind" with only "inconsiderable disturbance of function",^{[B1]} a rejoinder in the American Phrenological Journal‍—‌

That there was no difference in his mental manifestations after the recovery [is] not true ... he was gross, profane, coarse, and vulgar, to such a degree that his society was intolerable to decent people.

‍—‌was apparently based on information anonymously supplied by Harlow.^{[M]} Pointing out that Bigelow gave extensive verbatim quotations from Harlow's 1848 papers, yet failed to mention Harlow's promise to follow up with details of Gage's "mental manifestations", Barker explains Bigelow's and Harlow's contradictory evaluations (less than a year apart) by differences in their educational backgrounds, in particular their attitudes toward cerebral localization (the idea that different regions of the brain are specialized for different functions) and phrenology (the nineteenth-century pseudoscience holding that talents and personality can be inferred from the shape of a person's skull):

Harlow's interest in phrenology prepared him to accept the change in [Gage's] character as a significant clue to cerebral function which merited publication. Bigelow had [been taught] that damage to the cerebral hemispheres had no intellectual effect, and he was unwilling to consider Gage's deficit significant ... The use of a single case [including Gage's] to prove opposing views on phrenology was not uncommon.^{[B]}

A reluctance to ascribe a biological basis to "higher mental functions" (functions‍—‌such as language, personality, and moral judgment‍—‌beyond the merely sensory and motor) may have been a further reason Bigelow discounted the behavioral changes in Gage which Harlow had noted.^{[M]}^{[M1]}

=== Later observations (1858–1859) ===
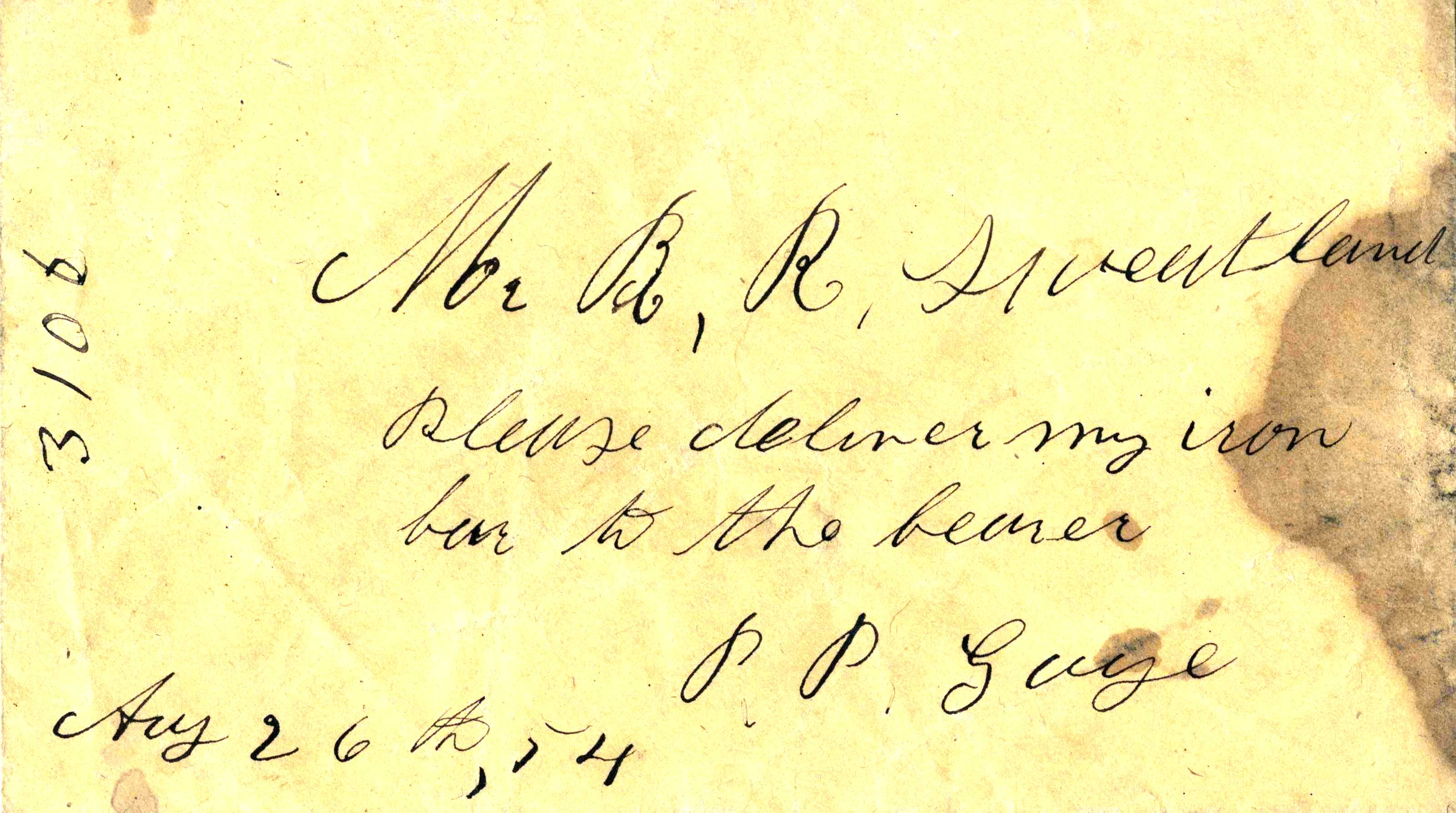
"Please deliver my iron bar to the bearer". While in Chile, Gage had his relative B. R. Sweetland retrieve the tamping iron from Harvard's Warren Anatomical Museum.

In 1860, an American physician who had known Gage in Chile in 1858 and 1859 described him as still "engaged in stage driving [and] in the enjoyment of good health, with no impairment whatever of his mental faculties".^{[M10]} Together with the fact that Gage was hired by his employer in advance, in New England, to become part of the new coaching enterprise in Chile,^{[H]}^{[M10]} this implies that Gage's most serious mental changes had been temporary, so that the "fitful, irreverent ... capricious and vacillating" Gage described by Harlow immediately after the accident became, over time, far more functional and far better adapted socially.^{[M1]}^{[M10]}

Macmillan writes that this conclusion is reinforced by the responsibilities and challenges associated with stagecoach work such as that done by Gage in Chile, including the requirement that drivers "be reliable, resourceful, and possess great endurance. But above all, they had to have the kind of personality that enabled them to get on well with their passengers." ^{[M]}^{[M10]} A day's work for Gage meant "a 13-hour journey over 100 miles [160 km] of poor roads, often in times of political instability or frank revolution. All this‍—‌in a land to whose language and customs Phineas arrived an utter stranger‍—‌militates as much against permanent disinhibition [i.e. an inability to plan and self-regulate] as do the extremely complex sensory-motor and cognitive skills required of a coach driver." ^{[M10]}^{[M1]} (An American visitor to Chile in 1855 wrote: "The departure of the coach was always a great event at Valparaiso‍—‌a crowd of ever-astonished Chilenos assembling every day to witness the phenomenon of one man driving six horses.")

=== Social recovery ===
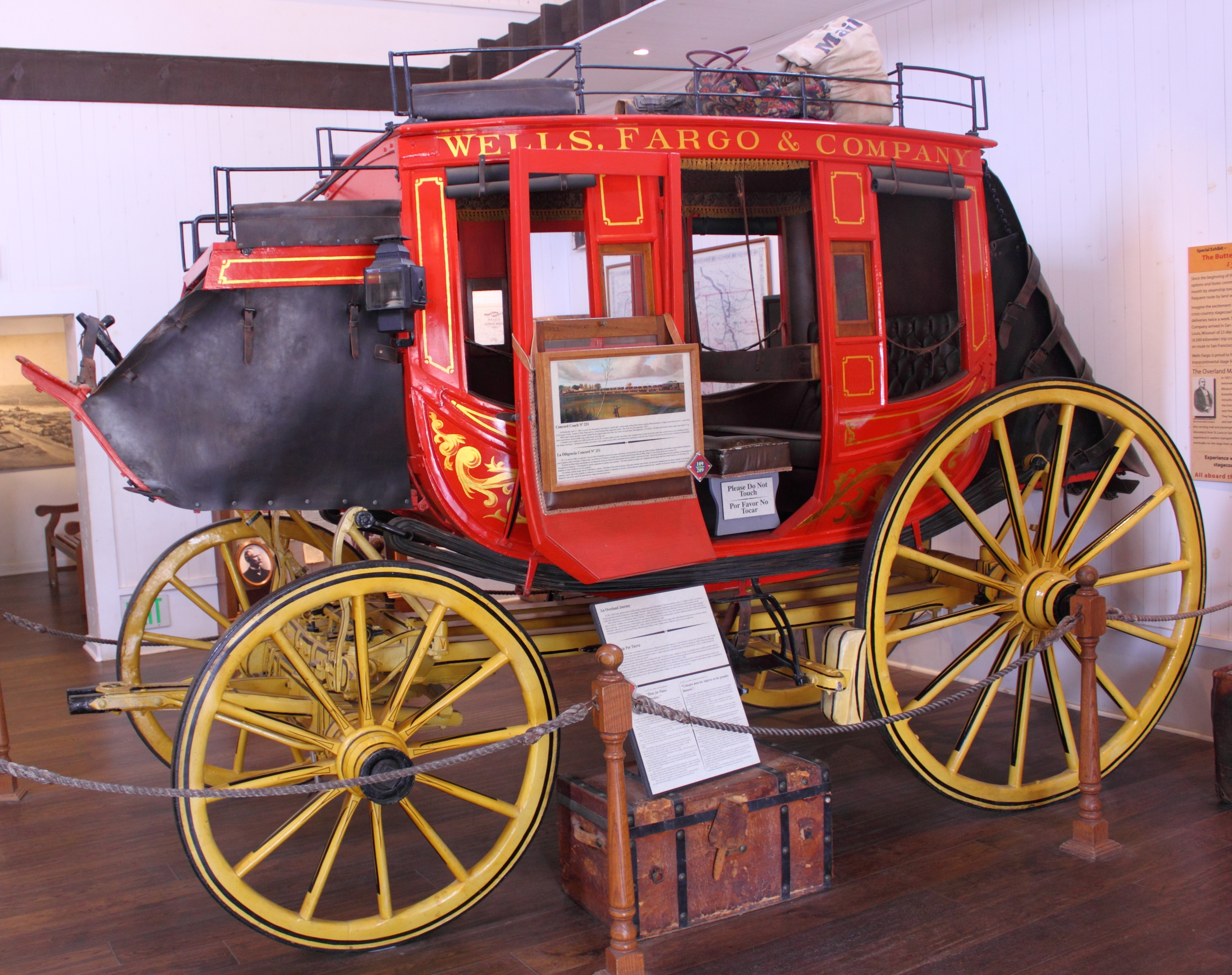
A Concord coach, likely the type driven by Gage in Chile (Note: Macmillan (2000), pp. 104, 121n13; Macmillan & Lena, p. 645)

Macmillan writes that this contrast‍—‌between Gage's early, versus later, post-accident behavior‍—‌reflects his "[gradual change] from the commonly portrayed impulsive and uninhibited person into one who made a reasonable 'social recovery'", citing persons with similar injuries for whom "someone or something gave enough structure to their lives for them to relearn lost social and personal skills":^{[M1]}

Phineas' survival and rehabilitation demonstrated a theory of recovery which has influenced the treatment of frontal lobe damage today. In modern treatment, adding structure to tasks by, for example, mentally visualising a written list, is considered a key method in coping with frontal lobe damage.^{[M4]}

According to contemporary accounts by visitors to Chile,^{[M1]}^{[M10]} Gage would have had to

rise early in the morning, prepare himself, and groom, feed, and harness the horses; he had to be at the departure point at a specified time, load the luggage, charge the fares and get the passengers settled; and then had to care for the passengers on the journey, unload their luggage at the destination, and look after the horses. The tasks formed a structure that required control of any impulsiveness he may have had.^{[M9]}

En route (Macmillan continues):

much foresight was required. Drivers had to plan for turns well in advance, and sometimes react quickly to manoeuvre around other coaches, wagons, and birlochos travelling at various speeds ... Adaptation had also to be made to the physical condition of the route: although some sections were well-made, others were dangerously steep and very rough.

Thus Gage's stagecoach work‍—‌"a highly structured environment in which clear sequences of tasks were required [but within which] contingencies requiring foresight and planning arose daily"‍—‌resembles rehabilitation regimens first developed by Soviet neuropsychologist Alexander Luria for the reestablishment of self-regulation in World War II soldiers suffering frontal lobe injuries.^{[M10]}^{[L2]}

A neurological basis for such recoveries may be found in emerging evidence "that damaged [neural] tracts may re-establish their original connections or build alternative pathways as the brain recovers" from injury. Macmillan adds that if Gage made such a recovery‍—‌if he eventually "figured out how to live" (as Fleischman put it)^{[F]} despite his injury‍—‌then it "would add to current evidence that rehabilitation can be effective even in difficult and long-standing cases";^{[M1]} and if Gage could achieve such improvement without medical supervision, "what are the limits for those in formal rehabilitation programs?" ^{[M9]} As author Sam Kean put it, "If even Phineas Gage bounced back‍—‌that's a powerful message of hope." ^{[K]}

=== Exaggeration and distortion of mental changes ===
A moral man, Phineas Gage
Tamping powder down holes for his wage
Blew his special-made probe
Through his left frontal lobe
Now he drinks, swears, and flies in a rage.

— Anonymous limerick^{[L1]}

Macmillan's analysis of scientific and popular accounts of Gage found that they almost always distort and exaggerate his behavioral changes well beyond anything described by anyone who had direct contact with him, concluding that the known facts are "inconsistent with the common view of Gage as a boastful, brawling, foul-mouthed, dishonest useless drifter, unable to hold down a job, who died penniless in an institution". In the words of Barker, "As years passed, the case took on a life of its own, accruing novel additions to Gage's story without any factual basis".^{[B]} Even today (writes Zbigniew Kotowicz) "Most commentators still rely on hearsay and accept what others have said about Gage, namely, that after the accident he became a psychopath";^{[K2]} Grafman has written that "the details of [Gage's] social cognitive impairment have occasionally been inferred or even embellished to suit the enthusiasm of the story teller";^{[G]} and Goldenberg calls Gage "a (nearly) blank sheet upon which authors can write stories which illustrate their theories and entertain the public".

For example, Harlow's statement that Gage "continued to work in various places; could not do much, changing often, and always finding something that did not suit him in every place he tried" ^{[H]} refers only to Gage's final months, after convulsions had set in.^{[M]}^{[M10]} But it has been misinterpreted as meaning that Gage never held a regular job after his accident, "was prone to quit in a capricious fit or be let go because of poor discipline", "never returned to a fully independent existence", "spent the rest of his life living miserably off the charity of others and traveling around the country as a sideshow freak", and died "in careless dissipation" while "dependent on his family" or "in the custody of his parents". In fact, after his initial post-recovery months spent traveling and exhibiting, Gage supported himself‍—‌at a total of just two different jobs‍—‌from early 1851 until just before his death in 1860.^{[M10]}^{[D]}

Other behaviors ascribed, by various authors, to the post-accident Gage that are either unsupported by, or in contradiction to, the known facts include the following:

- mistreatment of wife and children (though Gage actually had neither);
- inappropriate sexual behavior, promiscuity, or impaired sexuality;
- lack of forethought, concern for the future, or capacity for embarrassment;
- parading his self-misery, and vainglory in showing his wounds;
- "gambling" himself into "emotional and reputational ... bankruptcy";
- irresponsibility, untrustworthiness, aggressiveness, violence;
- vagrancy, begging, drifting, drinking;
- lying, brawling, bullying;
- psychopathy, inability to make ethical decisions;
- "[loss of] all respect for social conventions";
- acting like an "idiot" or a "lout";
- living as a "layabout" or a "boorish mess";
- "[alienating] almost everyone who had ever cared about him";
- dying "due to a debauch".

None of these behaviors are mentioned by anyone who had met Gage or even his family, and as Kotowicz put it, "Harlow does not report a single act that Gage should have been ashamed of." ^{[K2]} Gage is "a great story for illustrating the need to go back to original sources", writes Macmillan, most authors having been "content to summarize or paraphrase accounts that are already seriously in error". ^{[M]}

Nonetheless (write Daffner and Searl) "the telling of [Gage's] story has increased interest in understanding the enigmatic role that the frontal lobes play in behavior and personality", and Ratiu has said that in teaching about the frontal lobes, an anecdote about Gage is like an "ace [up] your sleeve. It's just like whenever you talk about the French Revolution you talk about the guillotine, because it's so cool." ^{[K]} Benderly suggests that instructors use the Gage case to illustrate the importance of critical thinking.

=== Extent of brain injury ===
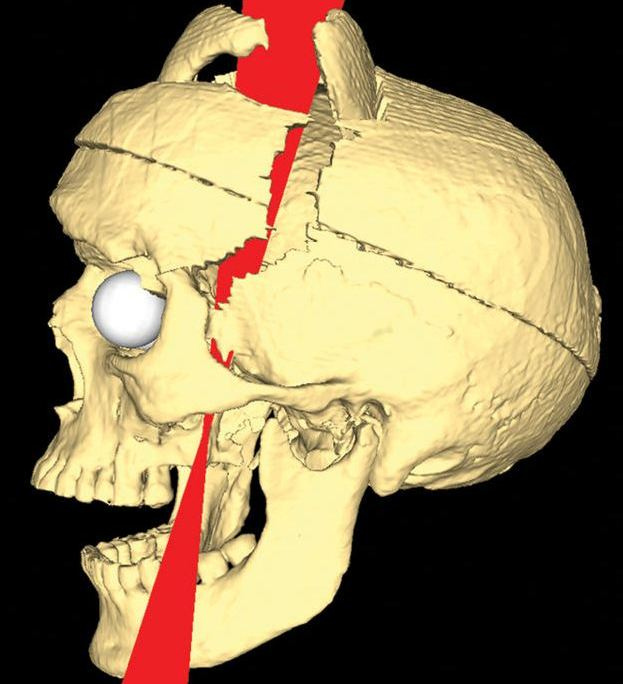
The "cone of uncertainty" for the path taken by the tamping iron, per Ratiu et al., who concluded that the front and back of Gage's skull temporarily "hinged" apart as the iron entered from below.

It is regretted that an autopsy could not have been had, so that the precise condition of the encephalon at the time of his death might have been known.

— J. M. Harlow (1868)^{[H]}

External videos
- Video reconstruction of tamping iron passing through Gage's skull (Ratiu et al.)^{[R1]} (registration required)

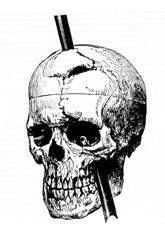
Debate about whether the trauma of Gage's accident, and the subsequent infection, had damaged Gage's left and right frontal lobes, or only the left, began almost immediately after his accident. (Note: Harlow's estimate of the iron's path (1868)^{[M]} Early attempts to estimate the extent of damage include those by: Harlow (1848);^{[H1]} Edward Elisha Phelps (1849); Bigelow (1850);^{[B1]} Harlow (1868);^{[H]} Hammond (1871); Dupuy (1873, 1877); Ferrier (1877–79); Bramwell (1888); Cobb (1940, 1943); Tyler & Tyler (1982).^{[T2]} See Macmillan (2000), Ch. 5.) The 1994 conclusion of Hanna Damasio et al., that the tamping iron did physical damage to both lobes, was drawn not from Gage's skull but from a cadaver skull digitally deformed to match the dimensions of Gage's^{[M1]}‍—‌and made a priori assumptions about the location of Gage's internal injuries and the exit wound which in some cases contradict Harlow's observations.^{[M]} Using CT scans of Gage's actual skull, Ratiu et al.^{[R]} and Van Horn et al.^{[V]} both rejected that conclusion, agreeing with Harlow's belief‍—‌based on probing Gage's wounds with his fingers‍—‌that only the left frontal lobe had been damaged. (Note: In any event, any such analysis can estimate only the initial, direct damage done by the passage of the tamping iron itself; it cannot account for additional damage from concussion, from bone fragments pushed along by the iron after it broke through the base of the cranium, or from the extensive bleeding and severe infection. Further uncertainty stems from individual variations in the position of the brain within the skull, and in the points at which various brain functions are localized.^{[M]})

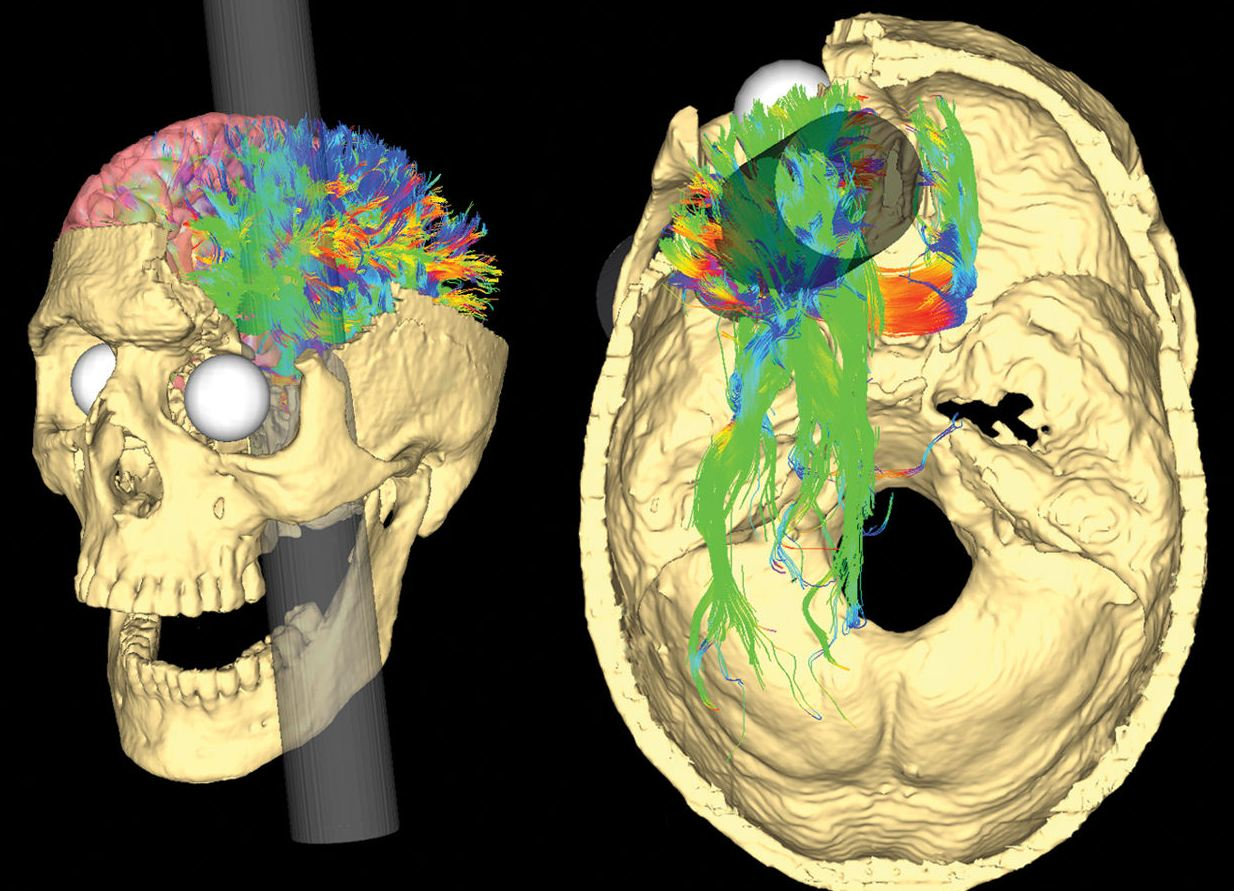
False-color representations of cerebral fiber pathways affected by Gage's accident, per Van Horn et al.^{[V]}

In addition, Ratiu et al. noted that the hole in the base of the cranium (created as the tamping iron passed through the sphenoidal sinus into the brain) has a diameter about half that of the iron itself; combining this with the hairline fracture beginning behind the exit region and running down the front of the skull, they concluded that the skull "hinged" open as the iron entered from below, then was pulled closed by the resilience of soft tissues once the iron had exited through the top of the head.^{[R]}^{[M1]}

Van Horn et al. concluded that damage to Gage's white matter (of which they made detailed estimates) was as or more significant to Gage's mental changes than cerebral cortex (gray matter) damage.^{[V]} Thiebaut de Schotten et al. estimated white-matter damage in Gage and two other case studies ("Tan" and "H.M."), concluding that these patients "suggest that social behavior, language, and memory depend on the coordinated activity of different [brain] regions rather than single areas in the frontal or temporal lobes."^{[T1]}

== Factors favoring Gage's survival ==
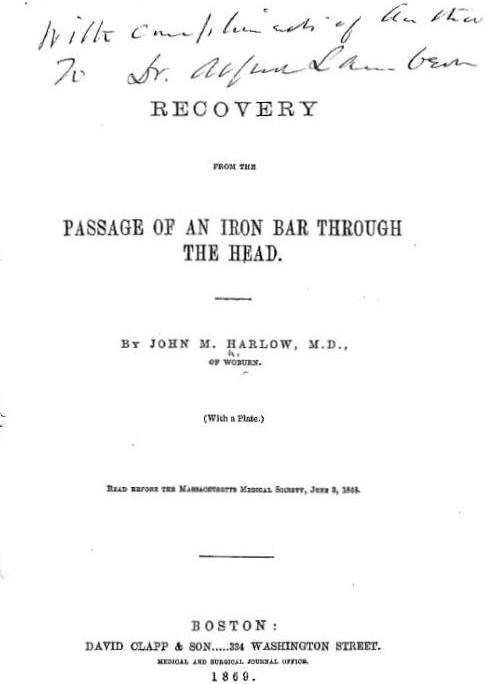
"I have the pleasure of being able to present to you [a case] without parallel in the annals of surgery." ^{[H]} Harlow's 1868 presentation to the Massachusetts Medical Society^{[H]} of Gage's skull, tamping iron, and post-accident history.

Harlow saw Gage's survival as demonstrating "the wonderful resources of the system in enduring the shock and in overcoming the effects of so frightful a lesion, and as a beautiful display of the recuperative powers of nature", and listed what he saw as the circumstances favoring it:

1st. The subject was the man for the case. His physique, will, and capacity of endurance, could scarcely be excelled.^{[H]}

For Harlow's description of the pre-accident Gage, see § Background, above.

2d. The shape of the missile‍—‌being pointed, round and comparatively smooth, not leaving behind it prolonged concussion or compression.^{[H]}

Despite its very large diameter and mass (compared to a weapon-fired projectile) the tamping iron's relatively low velocity drastically reduced the energy available to compressive and concussive "shock waves".^{[M]}

Harlow continued:

3d. The point of entrance ... [The tamping iron] did little injury until it reached the floor of the cranium, when, at the same time that it did irreparable damage, it [created the] opening in the base of the skull, for drainage, [without which] recovery would have been impossible. (Note: ^{[H]} Harlow's full text, "The point of entrance outside of the superior maxillary‍—‌the [tamping iron] did little injury ..." refers to the first point at which the tamping iron contacted bone; elsewhere he describes the initial penetration (i.e. of the tissue of the face) as "immediately anterior and external to the angle of the inferior maxillary bone",^{[H]} consistent with the analyses of Macmillan; Ratiu et al.; and Van Horn et al.^{[B1]}^{[H]}^{[M]})

Barker writes that "[Head injuries] from falls, horse kicks, and gunfire, were well known in pre–Civil War America [and] every contemporary course of lectures on surgery described the diagnosis and treatment" of such injuries. But to Gage's benefit, surgeon Joseph Pancoast had performed "his most celebrated operation for head injury before Harlow's medical class, [trepanning] to drain the pus, resulting in temporary recovery. Unfortunately, symptoms recurred and the patient died. At autopsy, reaccumulated pus was found: granulation tissue had blocked the opening in the dura." By keeping the exit wound open, and elevating Gage's head to encourage drainage from the cranium into the sinuses (through the hole made by the tamping iron), Harlow "had not repeated Professor Pancoast's mistake".^{[B]}^{[M]}

No attempt will be made by me to cite analogous cases, as after ransacking the literature of surgery in quest of such, I learn that all, or nearly all, soon came to a fatal result.

— J. M. Harlow (1868)^{[H]}

Finally,

4th. The portion of the brain traversed was, for several reasons, the best fitted of any part of the cerebral substance to sustain the injury.^{[H]}

Precisely what Harlow's "several reasons" were is unclear, but he was likely referring, at least in part, to the understanding (slowly developing since ancient times) that injuries to the front of the brain are less dangerous than are those to the rear, because the latter frequently interrupt vital functions such as breathing and circulation.^{[M]} For example, surgeon James Earle wrote in 1790 that "a great part of the cerebrum may be taken away without destroying the animal, or even depriving it of its faculties, whereas the cerebellum will scarcely admit the smallest injury, without being followed by mortal symptoms." ^{[M]}

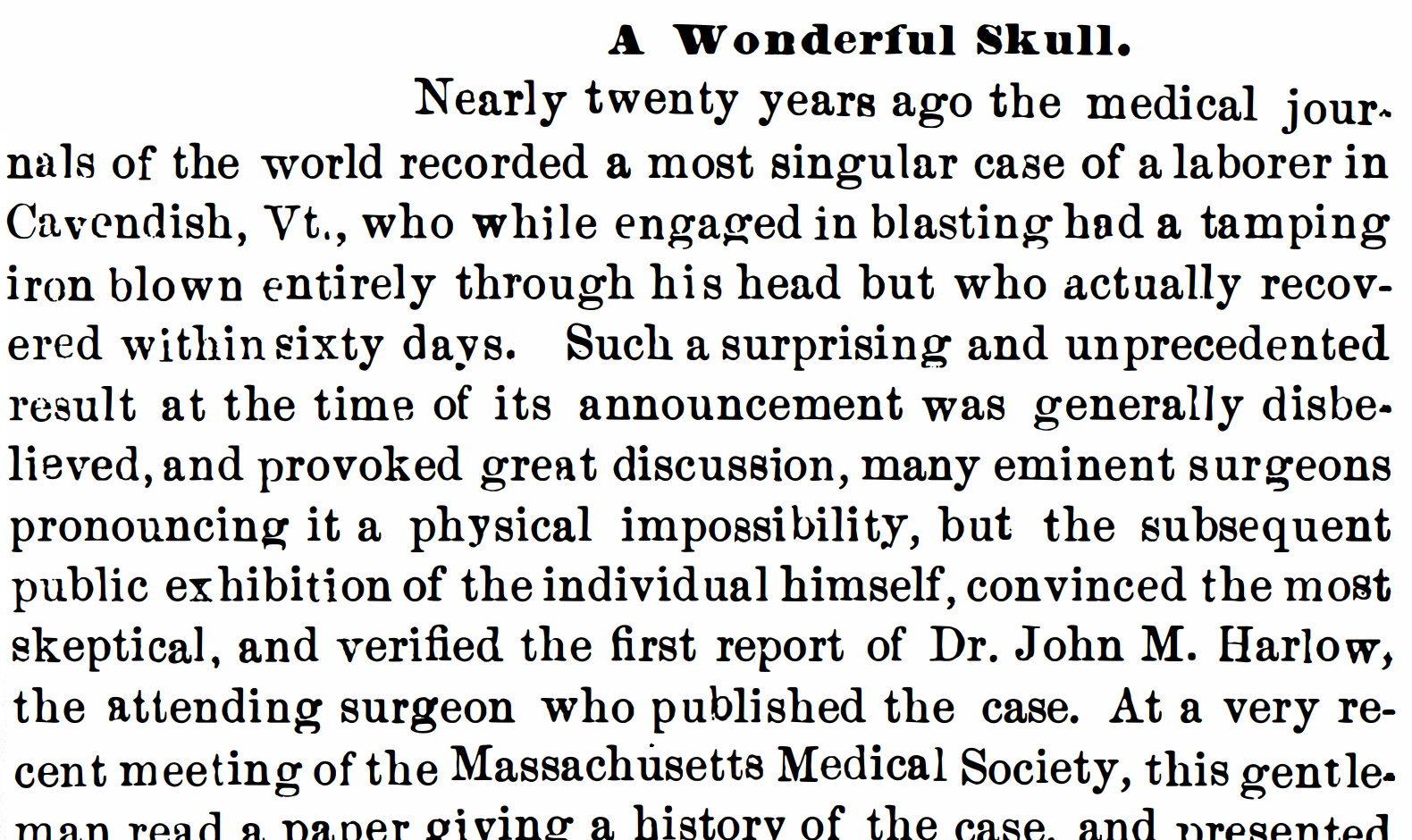
Harlow's 1868 paper on Gage was widely reported.^{[M]} This item appeared in Scientific American for July 1868.

Ratiu et al. and Van Horn et al. both concluded that the tamping iron passed left of the superior sagittal sinus and left it intact, both because Harlow does not mention loss of cerebrospinal fluid through the nose, and because otherwise Gage would almost certainly have suffered fatal blood loss or air embolism.^{[R]}^{[V]} Harlow's moderate (in the context of medical practice of the time) use of emetics, purgatives, and (in one instance) bleeding^{[M]} would have "produced dehydration with reduction of intracranial pressure [which] may have favorably influenced the outcome of the case", according to Steegmann.

As to his own role in Gage's survival, Harlow merely averred, "I can only say ... with good old Ambroise Paré, I dressed him, God healed him",^{[H]} but Macmillan calls this self-assessment far too modest. (Note: Macmillan (2000), p. 12, ch. 4, pp. 355–59; Macmillan (2008), pp. 28–29; Macmillan (2001), pp. 151–53.) Noting that Harlow had been a "relatively inexperienced local physician ... graduated four and a half years earlier",^{[M]} Macmillan's discussion of Harlow's "skillful and imaginative adaptation [of] conservative and progressive elements from the available therapies to the particular needs posed by Gage's injuries" emphasizes that Harlow "did not apply rigidly what he had learned", for example forgoing an exhaustive search for bone fragments (which risked hemorrhage and further brain injury) and applying caustic to the "fungi" instead of excising them (which risked hemorrhage) or forcing them into the wound (which risked compressing the brain).^{[M]}

== Early medical attitudes ==
=== Skepticism ===
The very small amount of attention that has been given to [this] case can only be explained by the fact that it far transcends any case of recovery from injury of the head that can be found in the records of surgery. It was too monstrous for belief ...

— J. B. S. Jackson (1870)

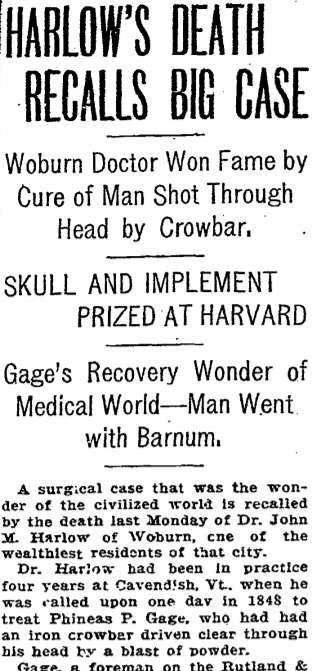
Boston Herald, 1907

Barker notes that Harlow's original 1848 report of Gage's survival and recovery "was widely disbelieved, for obvious reasons" ^{[B]} and Harlow, recalling this early skepticism in his 1868 retrospective, invoked the biblical story of Doubting Thomas:^{[L1]}

The case occurred nearly twenty years ago, in an obscure country town ..., was attended and reported by an obscure country physician, and was received by the Metropolitan Doctors with several grains of caution, insomuch that many utterly refused to believe that the man had risen, until they had thrust their fingers into the hole [in] his head, and even then they required of the Country Doctor attested statements, from clergymen and lawyers, before they could or would believe‍—‌many eminent surgeons regarding such an occurrence as a physiological impossibility, the appearances presented by the subject being variously explained away.

"A distinguished Professor of Surgery in a distant city", Harlow continued, had even dismissed Gage as a "Yankee invention".^{[H]}

According to the Boston Medical and Surgical Journal (1869) it was the 1850 report on Gage by Bigelow‍—‌Harvard's Professor of Surgery and "a majestic and authoritative figure on the medical scene of those times" ‍—‌that "finally succeeded in forcing [the case's] authenticity upon the credence of the profession ... as could hardly have been done by any one in whose sagacity and surgical knowledge his confrères had any less confidence". Noting that, "The leading feature of this case is its improbability ... This is the sort of accident that happens in the pantomime at the theater, not elsewhere", Bigelow emphasized that though "at first wholly skeptical, I have been personally convinced". (Note: In addition to the "attested statements" mentioned by Harlow (which Harlow had gathered at Bigelow's request) and his own examination of Gage, Bigelow pointed out that the accident had occurred "in open day" with many witnesses, and that "in a thickly populated country neighbourhood, to which all the facts were matter of daily discussion at the time of their occurrence, there is no difference of belief, nor has there been at any time doubt that the iron was actually driven through the brain. A considerable number of medical gentlemen also visited the case at various times to satisfy their incredulity." ^{[B1]}^{[M]})

Nonetheless (Bigelow wrote just before Harlow's 1868 presentation of Gage's skull) though "the nature of [Gage's] injury and its reality is now beyond doubt ... I have received a letter within a month [purporting] to prove that ... the accident could not have happened." ^{[B2]}

=== Standard for other brain injuries ===
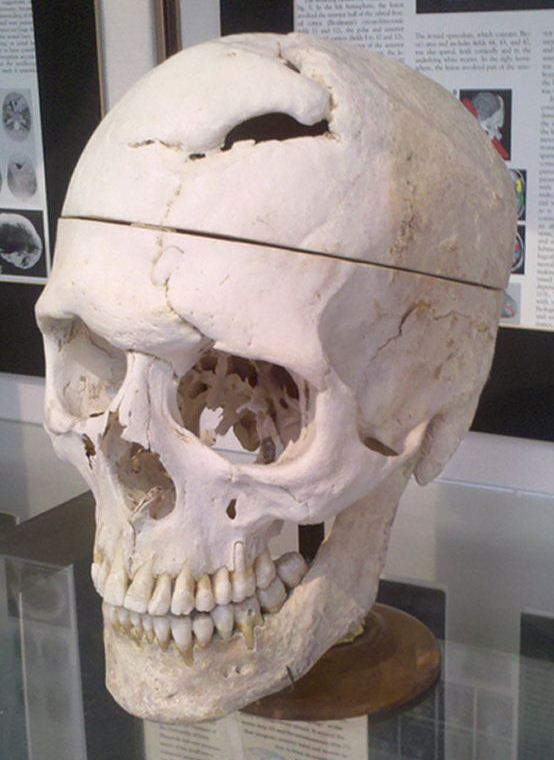
"[Few objects] have attracted more visitors and spread farther the fame of the Museum" than its "most valuable specimen"‍—‌Gage's skull.

As the reality of Gage's accident and survival gained credence, it became "the standard against which other injuries to the brain were judged", and it has retained that status despite competition from a growing list of other unlikely-sounding brain-injury accidents, including encounters with axes, bolts, low bridges, exploding firearms, a revolver shot to the nose, further tamping irons, and falling Eucalyptus branches.^{[M]} For example, after a miner survived traversal of his skull by a gas pipe 5/8 inch (1.6 cm) in diameter (extracted "not without considerable difficulty and force, owing to a bend in the portion of the rod in his skull"), his physician invoked Gage as the "only case comparable with this, in the amount of brain injury, that I have seen reported". (Note: ^{[M]} Immediately after Harlow's presentation unveiling Gage's skull and iron, Bigelow ("in one of those coups dramatiques which were now and then incidents of his surgical communications [and] without giving notice that he intended to do so") actually produced this patient, Joel Lenn, together with "the gas pipe which had pierced his head from the right forehead to left occiput, and the hat he had been wearing (with entrance and exit holes) ... This coup de théâtre must have been a painful coda for Harlow, eclipsing the pinnacle of his medical career." ^{[B]} Months after Lenn's accident his surgeon reported, "He seems to be perfectly rational, and will reply correctly in monosyllables to questions, but is entirely unable to connect words. He succeeds best, when excited, in swearing in French.")

Often these comparisons carried hints of humor, competitiveness, or both.^{[M]} The Boston Medical and Surgical Journal, for example, alluded to Gage's astonishing survival by referring to him as "the patient whose cerebral organism had been comparatively so little disturbed by its abrupt and intrusive visitor"; and a Kentucky doctor, reporting a patient's survival of a gunshot through the nose, bragged, "If you Yankees can send a tamping bar through a fellow's brain and not kill him, I guess there are not many can shoot a bullet between a man's mouth and his brains, stopping just short of the medulla oblongata, and not touch either." Similarly, when a lumbermill foreman returned to work soon after a saw cut three inches (8 cm) into his skull from just between the eyes to behind the top of his head, his surgeon (who had removed from this wound "thirty-two pieces of bone, together with considerable sawdust") termed the case "second to none reported, save the famous tamping-iron case of Dr. Harlow", though apologizing that "I cannot well gratify the desire of my professional brethren to possess [the patient's] skull, until he has no further use for it himself."

As these and other remarkable brain-injury survivals accumulated, the Boston Medical and Surgical Journal pretended to wonder whether the brain has any function at all: "Since the antics of iron bars, gas pipes, and the like skepticism is discomfitted, and dares not utter itself. Brains do not seem to be of much account now-a-days." The Transactions of the Vermont Medical Society was similarly facetious: "'The times have been,' says Macbeth [Act III], 'that when the brains were out the man would die. But now they rise again.' Quite possibly we shall soon hear that some German professor is exsecting it." ^{[L1]}

== Theoretical misuse ==
The Gage who appears in contemporary psychology textbooks is simply a compound creature ... a stunning example of the ideological uses of case histories and their mythological reconstruction.

— Rhodri Hayward

Though Gage is considered the "index case for personality change due to frontal lobe damage", ^{[B]}^{[F1]}^{[M]} the uncertain extent of his brain damage^{[F1]}^{[M]} and the limited understanding of his behavioral changes render him "of more historical than neurologic [sic] interest". Thus, Macmillan writes, "Phineas' story is [primarily] worth remembering because it illustrates how easily a small stock of facts becomes transformed into popular and scientific myth", (Note: Macmillan (2008), p. 831; Macmillan (2000), chs. 5–6,9–14; Macmillan (1996), pp. 251–59.) the paucity of evidence having allowed "the fitting of almost any theory [desired] to the small number of facts we have".^{[M]} A similar concern was expressed as early as 1877, when British neurologist David Ferrier (writing to Harvard's Henry Pickering Bowditch in an attempt "to have this case definitely settled") complained that, "In investigating reports on diseases and injuries of the brain, I am constantly being amazed at the inexactitude and distortion to which they are subject by men who have some pet theory to support. The facts suffer so frightfully ..." ^{[M]} More recently, neurologist Oliver Sacks refers to the "interpretations and misinterpretations [of Gage] from 1848 to the present", and Jarrett discusses the use of Gage to promote "the myth, found in hundreds of psychology and neuroscience textbooks, plays, films, poems, and YouTube skits[:] Personality is located in the frontal lobes ... and once those are damaged, a person is changed forever."

=== Cerebral localization ===
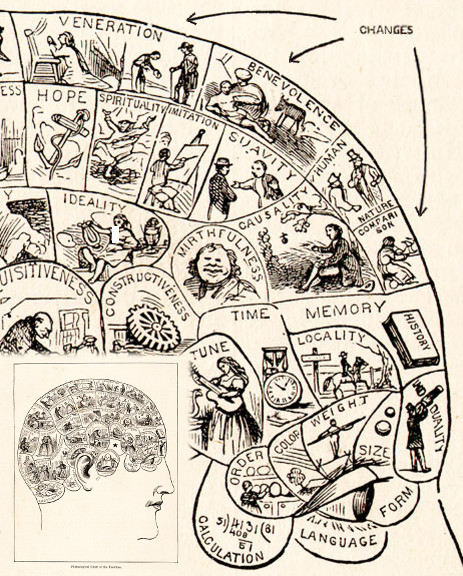
Phrenologists contended that destruction of the mental "organs" of Veneration and Benevolence caused Gage's behavioral changes. Harlow may have believed that the Organ of Comparison was damaged as well.

In the 19th-century debate over whether the various mental functions are or are not localized in specific regions of the brain, both sides managed to enlist Gage in support of their theories.^{[B]}^{[M]} For example, after Eugene Dupuy wrote that Gage proved that the brain is not localized (characterizing him as a "striking case of destruction of the so-called speech centre without consequent aphasia") Ferrier replied by using Gage (along with the woodcuts of his skull and tamping iron from Harlow's 1868 paper) to support his thesis that the brain is localized.^{[M]}^{[M5]}

=== Phrenology ===
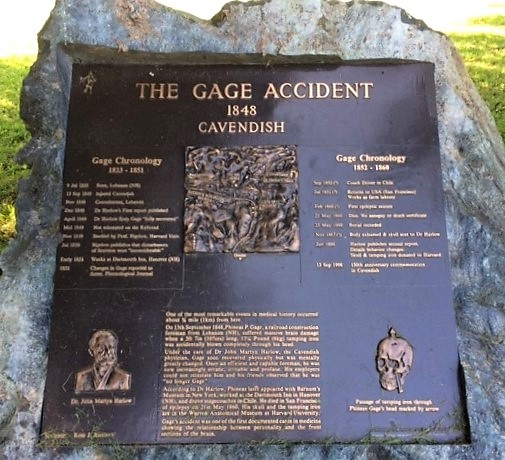
Memorial plaque, Cavendish, Vermont

Throughout the 19th century, adherents of phrenology contended that Gage's mental changes (his profanity, for example) stemmed from destruction of his mental "organ of Benevolence"‍—‌as phrenologists saw it, the part of the brain responsible for "goodness, benevolence, the gentle character ... [and] to dispose man to conduct himself in a manner conformed to the maintenance of social order"‍—‌and/or the adjacent "organ of Veneration"‍—‌related to religion and respect for peers and those in authority.^{[M]} (Phrenology held that the organs of the "grosser and more animal passions are near the base of the brain; literally the lowest and nearest the animal man [while] highest and farthest from the sensual are the moral and religions feelings, as if to be nearest heaven". Thus Veneration and Benevolence are at the apex of the skull‍—‌the region of exit of Gage's tamping iron.)

Harlow wrote that Gage, during his convalescence, did not "estimate size or money accurately[,] would not take $1000 for a few pebbles"^{[H1]} and was not particular about prices when visiting a local store;^{[H]} by these examples Harlow may have been implying damage to phrenology's "Organ of Comparison". (Note: ^{[B]}^{[H]} However, this is somewhat contradicted by Harlow's statement that Gage paid "with his habitual accuracy" during the store visit.^{[H]}^{[M]})

=== Psychosurgery and lobotomy ===
It is frequently asserted that what happened to Gage played a role in the later development of various forms of psychosurgery‍—‌particularly lobotomy‍—‌or even that Gage's accident constituted "the first lobotomy". Aside from the question of why the unpleasant changes usually (if hyperbolically) attributed to Gage would inspire surgical imitation, there is no such link, according to Macmillan:

There is simply no evidence that any of these operations were deliberately designed to produce the kinds of changes in Gage that were caused by his accident, nor that knowledge of Gage's fate formed part of the rationale for them^{[M2]}‍... [W]hat his case did show came solely from his surviving his accident: major operations [such as for tumors] could be performed on the brain without the outcome necessarily being fatal.^{[M]}

=== Somatic marker hypothesis ===
Antonio Damasio, in support of his somatic marker hypothesis (relating decision-making to emotions and their biological underpinnings), draws parallels between behaviors he ascribes to Gage and those of modern patients with damage to the orbitofrontal cortex and amygdala. But Damasio's depiction of Gage has been severely criticized, for example by Kotowicz:

Damasio is the principal perpetrator of the myth of Gage the psychopath ... Damasio changes [Harlow's] narrative, omits facts, and adds freely ... His account of Gage's last months [is] a grotesque fabrication [insinuating] that Gage was some riff-raff who in his final days headed for California to drink and brawl himself to death ... It seems that the growing commitment to the frontal lobe doctrine of emotions brought Gage to the limelight and shapes how he is described.^{[K2]}

As Kihlstrom put it, "[M]any modern commentators exaggerate the extent of Gage's personality change, perhaps engaging in a kind of retrospective reconstruction based on what we now know, or think we do, about the role of the frontal cortex in self-regulation."^{[K1]} Macmillan^{[M]} gives detailed criticism of Antonio Damasio's various presentations of Gage (some of which are joint work with Hannah Damasio and others).

== Portraits ==
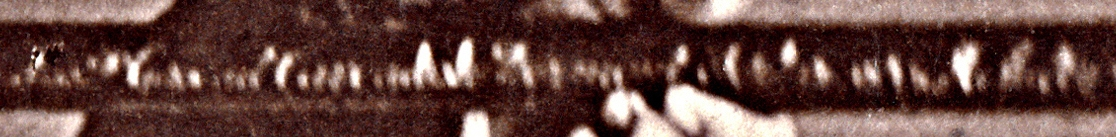
Inscription on iron as seen in portrait detail: ... [Phine]has P. Gage at Cavendish, Vermont, Sept. 14, 1848. He fully ...

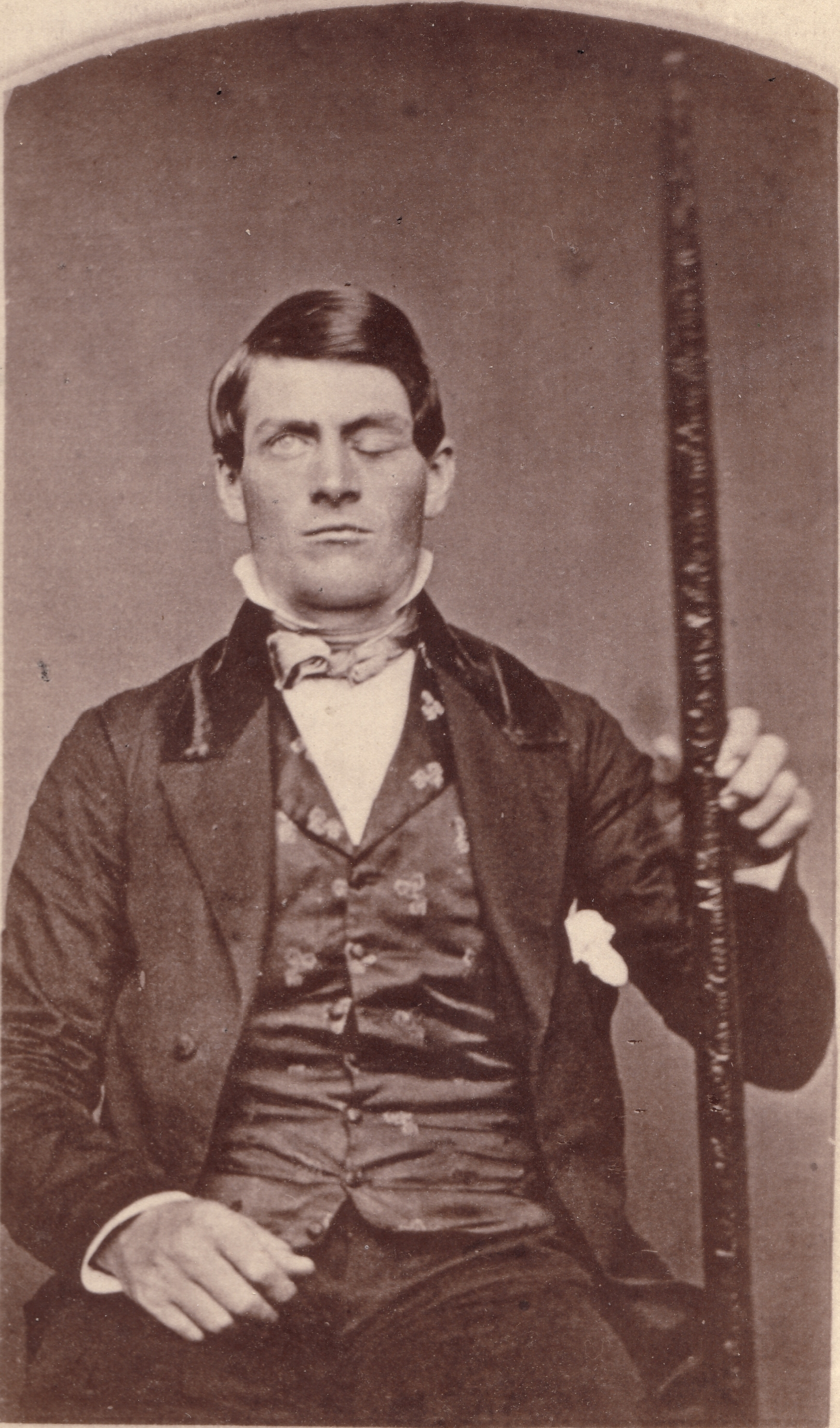
The second portrait of Gage identified (2010)

Two daguerreotype portraits of Gage, identified in 2009 and 2010, are the only likenesses^{[W]}^{[T]}^{[W1]} of him known other than a plaster head cast taken for Bigelow in late 1849 (and now in the Warren Museum along with Gage's skull and tamping iron). The first portrait shows a "disfigured yet still-handsome" Gage^{[T]} with left eye closed and scars clearly visible, "well dressed and confident, even proud" ^{[W]} and holding his iron, on which portions of its inscription can be made out.^{[W2]} (For decades the portrait's owners had believed that it depicted an injured whaler with his harpoon.)^{[W2]} The second portrait, copies of which are in the possession of two branches of the Gage family, shows Gage in a somewhat different pose, wearing the same waistcoat and possibly the same jacket, but with a different shirt and tie.^{[W3]}^{[L]}

Authenticity of the portraits was confirmed by overlaying the inscription on the tamping iron, as seen in the portraits, against that on the actual tamping iron, and matching the subject's injuries to those preserved in the head cast.^{[W]}^{[L]} However, about when, where, and by whom the portraits were taken nothing is known, except that they were created no earlier than January 1850 (when the inscription was added to the tamping iron),^{[M10]} on different occasions, and are likely by different photographers.^{[W1]}

The portraits support other evidence that Gage's most serious mental changes were temporary.^{[M9]} "That [Gage] was any form of vagrant following his injury is belied by these remarkable images", wrote Van Horn et al.^{[V]} "Although just one picture," Kean commented in reference to the first image discovered, "it exploded the common image of Gage as a dirty, disheveled misfit. This Phineas was proud, well-dressed, and disarmingly handsome." ^{[K]}

== See also ==
- Anatoli Bugorski – scientist whose head was struck by a particle-accelerator proton beam
- Eadweard Muybridge – another early case of head injury leading to mental changes
- Alexis St. Martin – man whose abdominal fistula allowed pioneering studies of digestion
- Henry Molaison – patient "H.M.", who developed severe anterograde amnesia after surgery for epilepsy
- Lev Zasetsky – soldier who developed agnosia and other symptoms after a bullet destroyed much of his parieto-occipital area
- Ahad Israfil – recovered from a gunshot injury that destroyed most of his right cerebral hemisphere
- Portrait of Gregor Baci – Sixteenth-century portrait purportedly depicting a Hungarian nobleman who survived cranial impalement by a lance through the eye
- Cognitive neuropsychology
- Cognitive rehabilitation therapy
- Neuroplasticity
- Neurorehabilitation
- Occupational therapy
- Rehabilitation (neuropsychology)
