= James Jackson Putnam =

American neurologist

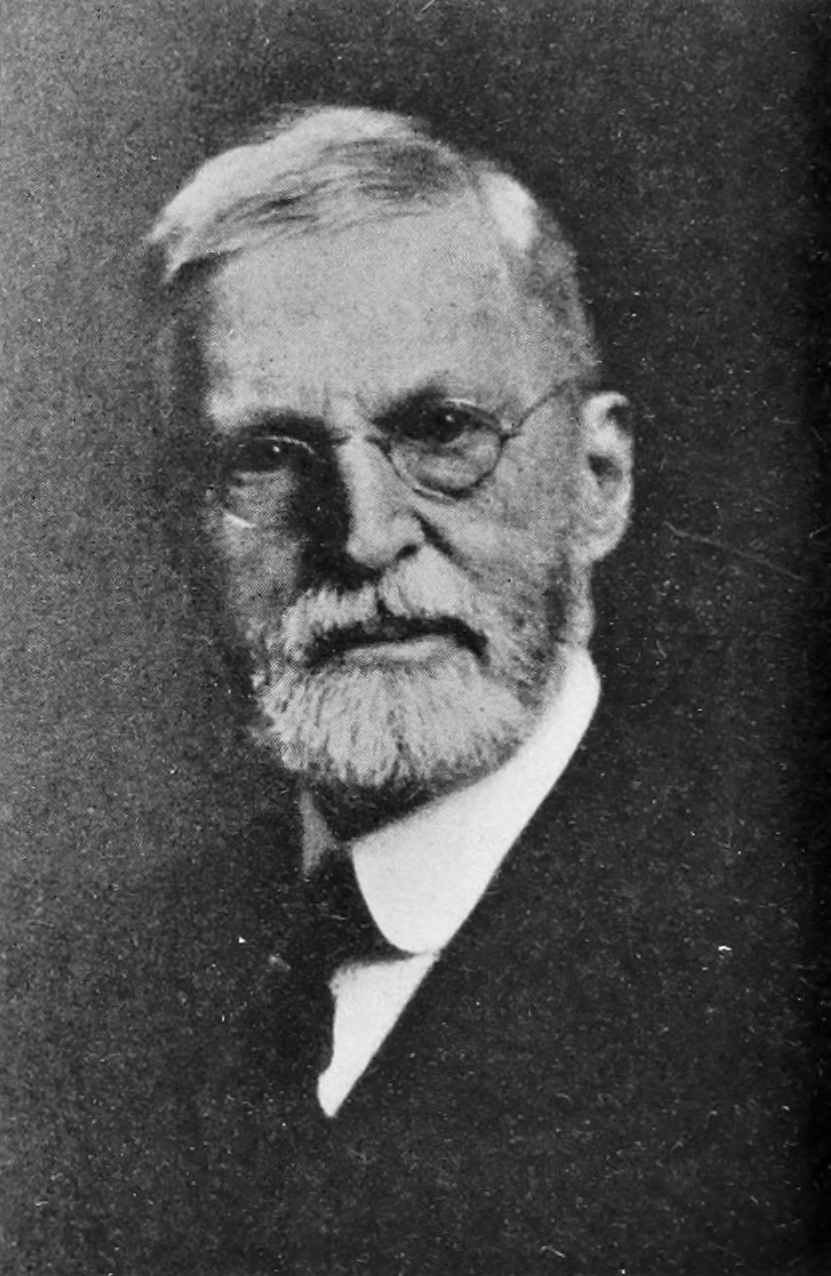
James J. Putnam

James Jackson Putnam (October 3, 1846 – November 4, 1918) was an American neurologist.

== Biography ==
Born in Boston, Massachusetts and graduated from Harvard College with a Bachelor of Arts degree in 1866, Putnam went to Europe to study in the company of Baron Carl von Rokitansky, Theodor Meynert and John Hughlings Jackson. He then attended Harvard Medical School from 1872-1875, graduating in 1876 with a Doctor of Medicine degree. On his return to the Massachusetts General Hospital he opened a clinic which became the Department of Neurology at Harvard Medical School.

Putnam was a founder member of the American Neurological Association in December 1874, and was its president in 1888, and also a founding member of the American Psychoanalytical Association in 1911, being its first president and continuing to hold the post the following year. He was appointed Professor of Diseases of the Nervous System at Harvard in 1893 and continued to his retirement in 1912.

In 1900 he was one of the signatories of the “Protest of the Friends of the Present Management of the New York Pathological Institute” together with S. Weir Mitchell, Percival Bailey, Ira Van Gieson, Morton Prince, Frederick Peterson and many others. Putnam was one of those instrumental in bringing Sigmund Freud to the United States in 1909 and became increasingly interested in psychoneurosis and the use of psychotherapy contributing to The Encyclopedia of the Self, writing papers on the necessity of metaphysics and human motives, both later published as books. He also wrote the introduction to the translation from the German of Sigmund Freud's Three Contributions to the Theory of Sex He made a number of contributions to neurology and medicine in general – for example highlighting the fact that hyperthyroidism may terminate in myxoedema. He also did very early investigative work on the basal ganglia.

Putnam has given his name to Putnam’s acroparaesthesia, a condition characterized by numbness, tingling, anaesthesia and discolouration of the hands on waking in the morning. Together with Charles L. Dana M.D. (1852–1935) he also described the Putnam-Dana syndrome which is a form of generalized subacute neurological degeneration caused by Vit.B_{12} deficiency.

In 1875–1876, Putnam, Henry Pickering Bowditch (1840–1911), William James (1842–1910), and his brother Charles Pickering Putnam (1844–1914) founded the Putnam Camp at St. Huberts, Essex County, New York.

Putnam lived in Cotuit, Massachusetts.

== Works ==
- Putnam, James J. Report on Electro-therapeutics (Containing Some Final Alterations). Boston, 1873.
- Putnam, James J., and George A. Waterman. Studies in Neurological Diagnosis. Boston: Ellis, 1902.
- Putnam, James J. A Memoir of Dr. James Jackson, with Sketches of his Father, Hon. Jonathan Jackson, and his brothers, Robert, Henry, Charles, and Patrick Tracy Jackson; and some account of their ancestry. Boston: Houghton, Mifflin, 1905.
- Putnam, James J. “Personal Impressions of Sigmund Freud: his work with special reference to his recent lectures at Clark University,” The Journal of Abnormal Psychology 46(6) (Feb.-March 1910): 372–379.
- Putnam, James J. On Some of the Broader Issues of the Psychoanalytic Movement. [Philadelphia?: s.n., 1914?]
- Putnam, James J. Human Motives. Boston: Little, Brown, and Co., 1915.
