= Sarah Gooll Putnam =

American painter

- Born: c. 1851; Boston, Massachusetts
- Died: 1912 (aged 60–61); Chocorua, New Hampshire
- Known for: Painting

Sarah Gooll Putnam (c. 1851–1912) was an American painter. From a prominent Boston family, she was known for her portraits and landscapes.

== Biography ==
Putnam was born in about 1851 in Boston, Massachusetts. As a young girl she made sketches and later worked in oils and watercolors. She studied art in New York, Munich, and Holland, and painted portraits of family, friends, and other Bostonians of her social standing. She studied with Helen M. Knowlton, Louisa Crowninshield Bacon, and George Chickering Munzig before enrolling in the first class of students at the School of the Museum of Fine Arts, Boston in 1877.

Putnam received her first portrait commission in 1883 and went on to have several one-woman shows, and was included in group shows at the St. Botolph Club, the Boston Art Club and the Museum of Fine Arts, Boston.

Putnam exhibited her work at the 1893 World's Columbian Exposition in Chicago, Illinois.

Putnam never married and she died in 1912 in Chocorua, New Hampshire.

== Diaries ==
Sarah Gooll Putnam kept a consistent collection of diaries beginning at age nine (November 26, 1860). The documents are a record of her career as a portrait painter, her extensive travels, and significant historic moments. When she was fourteen, Abraham Lincoln was assassinated on April 14, 1865. Though primarily living in Boston, Massachusetts, she recorded the shock and sadness of hearing about the Lincoln assassination.

== Legacy ==
Putnam's diaries from 1860 to 1912 are in the Massachusetts Historical Society. Several of her portraits are in Harvard Art Museums.

== Gallery ==
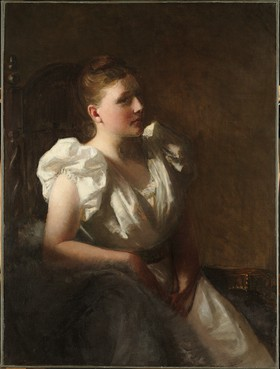
Portrait of Amy Lowell, by Sarah Gooll Putnam, nd

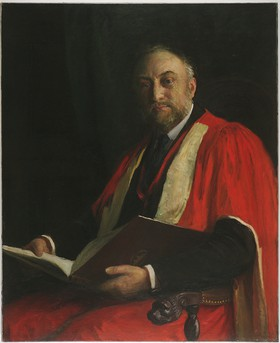
Portrait of Edward Charles Pickering, by Sarah Gooll Putnam, nd

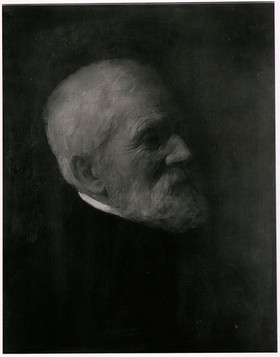
Portrait of Francis Boott, by Sarah Gooll Putnam, nd

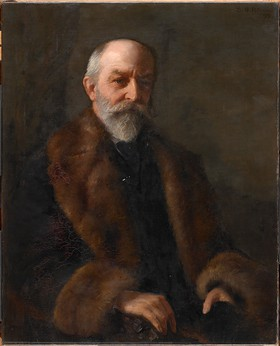
Portrait of Henry Pickering Bowditch, by Sarah Gooll Putnam, nd
