= Putnam Camp =

- U.S. National Register of Historic Places
- U.S. Historic district
- Location within New York Location within the United States
- Location: 1196 NY 73, St. Huberts, New York
- Coordinates: 44°09′13″N 73°46′05″W
- Area: 13.39 acres (5.42 ha)
- Built: c. 1850, 1875–1905
- Architectural style: Mid 19th century
- NRHP reference No.: 12000876
- Added to NRHP: October 17, 2012

Putnam Camp is a historic former farm and Adirondack seasonal camp and national historic district located at St. Huberts, Essex County, New York. The district encompasses 11 contributing buildings and 1 contributing structure in the Lower Camp and Upper Camp relating to the property's historic uses as a farm and later a camp. It was developed in the mid-19th century as the Beede farm and the property includes the Beede farmhouse (c. 1850) and timber frame barn / woodshop (c. 1850). Later farm-related buildings include the Bungalow (pre-1875, 1894). The camp was established in 1875–1876 and subsequently cabins were built including the Coop (c. 1878), Chatterbox (c. 1890), Stoop (c. 1877), Shanty (c. 1875), Nursery (c. 1888) and Parent's Assistant (c. 1890), Ark (1905), and the Doctor's House (c. 1905). The property was developed in the mid-1870s by three prominent Boston families - Bowditch, Putnam, and James, namely Henry Pickering Bowditch (1840–1911), William James (1842–1910), Charles Pickering Putnam (1844–1914), and James Jackson Putnam (1846–1918).

It was added to the National Register of Historic Places in 2012.
