= Henry Pickering Bowditch =

American physiologist and educator (1840–1911)

Dean Henry Pickering Bowditch
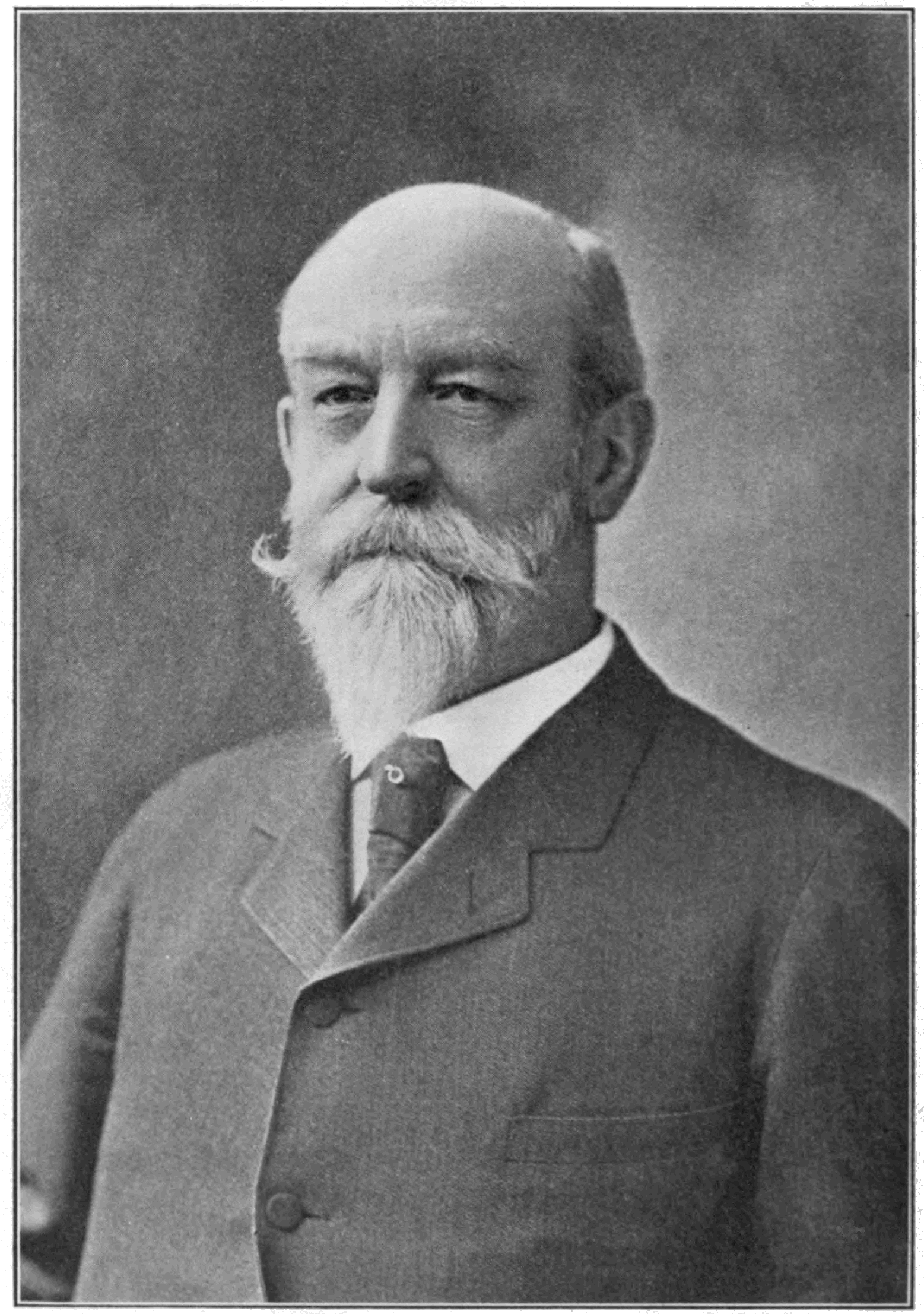
- Dean of Harvard Medical School
- Born: April 4, 1840; Boston
- Died: March 13, 1911 (aged 70); Jamaica Plain, Massachusetts
- Education: Lawrence Scientific School; Harvard University
- Known for: All-or-none law Kymograph
- Spouse: Selma Knuth
- Scientific career
- Fields: Physiology
- Workplaces: Harvard Medical School
- Academic advisors: Claude Bernard, Wilhelm Kuhne, Max Schultze, Carl Ludwig
- Notable students: Walter B. Cannon; Charles Sedgwick Minot; G. Stanley Hall

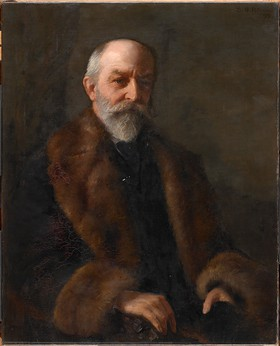
Portrait (undated) by Sarah Gooll Putnam

Henry Pickering Bowditch (April 4, 1840 – March 13, 1911) was an American soldier, physician, physiologist, and dean of the Harvard Medical School. Following his teacher Carl Ludwig, he promoted the training of medical practitioners in a context of physiological research. His teaching career at Harvard spanned 35 years. He is known for Bowditch effect.

== Early life ==
Henry P. Bowditch was born to the Massachusetts Bowditch family, noted for the mathematician Nathaniel Bowditch, his grandfather, and the archaeologist Charles Pickering Bowditch, his brother. He was born in Boston, Massachusetts to Jonathan Ingersoll Bowditch and Lucy Orne Nichols Bowditch. Like his brother, he attended the Dixwell School. In 1861, he graduated from Harvard College, and then entered Harvard’s Lawrence Scientific School. His studies there were interrupted by his service in the Union Army during the American Civil War, where he rose to the rank of major in the Fifth Massachusetts Colored Cavalry Regiment.

After graduation from Harvard Medical School in 1868, he went to Paris to study with Claude Bernard. In Bernard’s lab he worked alongside Louis-Antoine Ranvier, later known for neuroanatomy, and Étienne-Jules Marey who promoted the use of photography to capture physiological dynamics. According to Walter Bradford Cannon, when in Paris, Bowditch joined with fellow Bostonians John Collins Warren Jr., William James, and Charles Emerson for frog-hunting parties. Bowditch continued his European studies in Bonn with Wilhelm Kuhne and Max Schultze. Ultimately he proceeded to Leipzig where Carl Ludwig was conducting the program that Bowditch would emulate at Harvard. Bowditch impressed Ludwig by constructing an improvement on the kymograph then in use. His studies in Leipzig brought him into contact with, among others, Ray Lankester, Angelo Mosso, Hugo Kronecker and Carl von Voit.

== Career ==
Bowditch was appointed assistant professor of physiology at Harvard in 1871. While still in Germany, he purchased European materials to support the investigative training program he planned. And dramatically, on 9 September 1871, just days before sailing for Boston, he married Selma Knuth of Leipzig. The Bowditch laboratory at Harvard, the first physiological laboratory in the United States, began modestly in attic rooms.

In 1875–1876, Bowditch, William James, Charles Pickering Putnam, and James Jackson Putnam founded the Putnam Camp at St. Huberts, Essex County, New York.

Bowditch's career at Harvard was parallel to that of William James who instituted his program of experimental psychology in 1875. Bowditch and James represented the New Education espoused by Charles William Eliot, Harvard's President. In 1876 Bowditch was promoted to full professor. In 1887 he co-founded and was the first president of the American Physiological Society. At Harvard he rose to the position of dean of the medical school, serving from 1883 to 1893. In 1903 he was honoured with the George Higginson chair. In 1904, Bowditch was elected as a member of the American Philosophical Society. After 35 years teaching for Harvard, he retired in 1906, and died in Jamaica Plains, Massachusetts in 1911 of Parkinson's disease. His students included Walter Bradford Cannon, Charles Sedgwick Minot and G. Stanley Hall.

Manfred Bowditch, Henry's son, gave a personal description of his father. Bowditch did much experimentation in a cottage at an Adirondack camp at the head of Keene Valley which bore his name. There, with a well-equipped workshop the son witnessed considerable "inventiveness and manual skill" that Henry also applied in the physiology lab.

Bowditch was granted honorary degrees from five universities: Cambridge, Edinburgh, Toronto, Pennsylvania, and Harvard. Since 1956 the American Physiological Society has selected a distinguished physiologist to deliver the "Henry Pickering Bowditch Award Lecture".

== Research ==
Henry Pickering Bowditch was known for his physiological work on cardiac contraction and knee jerk. He also developed an interest in anthropometry, and showed that nutrition and environmental factors contribute to physiological development. Bowditch can be seen as a link between the milieu interieur of Claude Bernard, his teacher, and homeostasis as developed by his student Walter Cannon.
