= John Martyn Harlow =

American physician

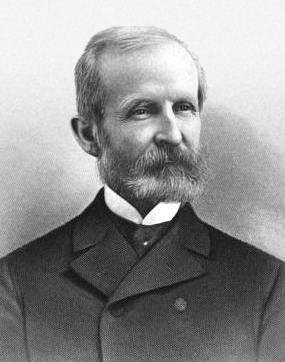
- Born: November 25, 1819; Whitehall, New York
- Died: May 13, 1907 (aged 87); Woburn, Massachusetts
- Education: Philadelphia School of Anatomy, Jefferson Medical College
- Occupations: Physician, bank director
- Known for: Attendance on brain-injury survivor Phineas Gage

John Martyn Harlow (1819–1907) was an American physician primarily remembered for his attendance on brain-injury survivor Phineas Gage, and for his published reports on Gage's accident and subsequent history.

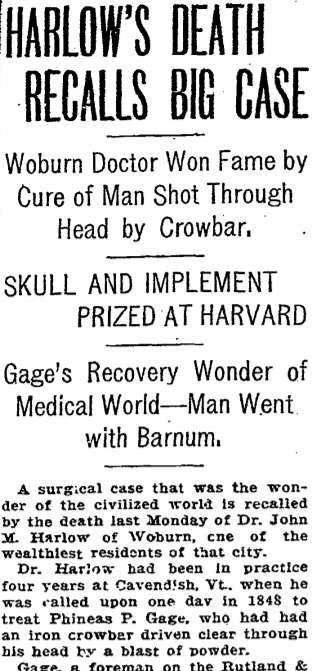
Boston Herald, May 20, 1907

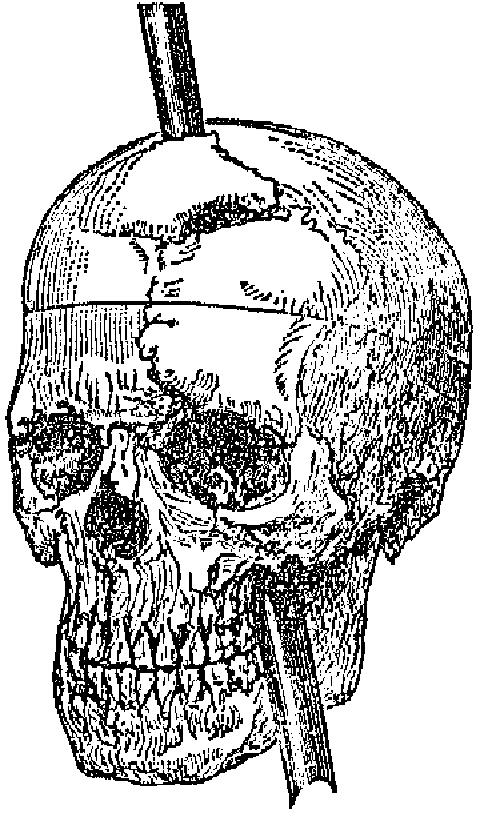
Gage's iron rod in brain

Harlow was born in Whitehall, New York on November 25, 1819 to Ransom and Annis Martyn Harlow. He studied at Philadelphia School of Anatomy and in 1844 graduated from Jefferson Medical College, Philadelphia with an M.D.

His practice in Cavendish, Vermont, where Gage's accident occurred in 1848, brought Gage under his care. In 1857, he left Cavendish due to poor health, and spent three years traveling and studying in Minnesota and Philadelphia before taking up practice in Woburn, Massachusetts in 1861.

His first paper on Gage appeared in Boston Medical and Surgical Journal in late 1848; a short progress note appeared early the next year. Almost twenty years later, in 1868, he published a final paper recounting what he had been able to learn about the subsequent history of his patient (who died in 1860), and presenting psychological changes in Gage which, presumably, were sequelae of the accident. In one of the most remarkably strange examples ever of dogged long-term medical follow-up, Harlow, having "trac[ed Gage] in his wanderings over the greater part of this continent" (Note: Harlow, John Martyn (1868). "Recovery from the Passage of an Iron Bar through the Head". Publications of the Massachusetts Medical Society. 2 (3): 327–47. Reprinted: David Clapp & Son (1869) [scan]) (by which he meant South as well as North America, Gage having spent seven years in Chile before continuing to California) had even obtained Gage's skull for use in preparing the paper.

Harlow was highly active in Woburn civic affairs, serving at various times on the town's water, drainage, and schools committees, and as a library trustee; he was also a state senator and member of the Massachusetts Governor's Council, a trustee of the Massachusetts General Hospital, a bank president and director of another bank, a director of the local gas company, and a local medical official during the Civil War.

On Harlow's death in 1907, The New York Times called him "one of the oldest and most prominent physicians and surgeons of New England". (Note: The New York Times, May 14, 1907) Childless (although twice married, first to Charlotte Davis and second to Frances Kimball), he left most of his substantial wealth to charity, for example endowing a ward for the poor at Massachusetts General Hospital and a book fund at Woburn Memorial High School's library, which is named for him.

== Publications ==
- Harlow, John Martyn (1848). "Passage of an iron rod through the head". Boston Medical and Surgical Journal. 39 (20): 389–393. doi:10.1056/nejm184812130392001. PMC 7894997. (also issued as an offprint, vide Cordasco, 60-0808)
- Harlow, John Martyn (1868). "Recovery from the Passage of an Iron Bar through the Head". Publications of the Massachusetts Medical Society. 2 (3): 327–47. Reprinted: David Clapp & Son (1869) [scan]
