= Bowditch effect =

Phenomenon by which myocardial tension increases with increase in heart rate

The Bowditch effect, also known as the Treppe phenomenon or Treppe effect or Staircase Phenomenon, is an autoregulation method by which myocardial tension increases with an increase in heart rate. It was first observed by Henry Pickering Bowditch in 1871.

== Mechanism ==
The underlying cause of the Bowditch effect is an increase in the calcium concentration in the sarcoplasmic reticulum of cardiac muscle cells, and its increased release into sarcoplasm.

One of the explanations for an increase in the intracellular calcium concentration is the inability of the Na^{+}/K^{+}-ATPase to keep up with influx of sodium at higher heart rates. When a higher heart rate occurs, for example due to adrenergic stimulation, the L-type calcium channel has increased activity. The sodium-calcium exchanger (which allows 3 Na^{+} to flow down its electrochemical gradient in exchange for 1 Ca^{++} ion to flow out of the cell) works to decrease the levels of intracellular calcium. As the heart rate becomes more robust, and the length of diastole decreases, the Na^{+}/K^{+}-ATPase, which removes the Na^{+} brought into the cell by the Na^{+}/Ca^{++} exchanger, does not keep up with the rate of Na^{+} influx. This leads to a less efficient Na^{+}/Ca^{++} exchange, since the gradient is decreasing for sodium and the driving force behind calcium transport is actually the concentration gradient of sodium, therefore Ca^{++} builds up within the cell. This results in an accumulation of calcium in the myocardial cell via the sodium calcium exchanger and leads to a greater state of inotropism, a mechanism which is also seen with cardiac glycosides.

Alternatively, another mechanism is that the Na^{+}-Ca^{++} membrane exchanger, which operates continually, has less time to remove the Ca^{++} that arrives in the cell. This occurs because of the decreased length of diastole with positive chronotropy. With an increased intracellular Ca^{++} concentration, there follows a positive inotropy.

It has also been observed that increased heart rate stimulates SERCA2a, which increases the calcium inflow and content in the sarcoplasmic reticulum. This activation of SERCA2a is indirectly by the phosphorylation of phospholamban (PLN) by calmodulin kinase II (CAMK).

== Clinical significance ==
Positive Bowditch effect causes an increase in cardiac output due to the increased force of contraction of heart muscles.

This phenomenon is usually absent or even reversed (negative Bowditch effect) in heart failure and other diseases of heart, such as cardiomyopathy and coronary artery disease. This is termed as the null or inverse staircase phenomenon. The probable cause for this effect is attributed to mutations in SERCA2a.

== History ==
The Bowditch effect was first observed by Henry Pickering Bowditch in 1871, after whom it is named.
