= Clive Wearing =

British conductor with severe amnesia

- Born: 11 May 1938 (age 88); Birmingham, England
- Genre: Early music
- Occupations: Musicologist, conductor and keyboardist (until 1983)

Clive Wearing (born 11 May 1938) is a British former musicologist, conductor, tenor and pianist who developed chronic anterograde and retrograde amnesia in 1985. Since then, he has lacked the ability to form new memories and cannot recall aspects of his memories, frequently believing that he has only recently awoken from a comatose state.

== Early life ==
Clive Wearing was born in Birmingham in 1938, one of three siblings. While speaking to the neurologist Oliver Sacks some years after the onset of his illness, he claimed to remember doodlebugs falling on Birmingham during the Second World War, indicating that he retains aspects of his episodic memory from the distant past. He was educated at King Edward VI School, Aston, and Clare College, Cambridge, where he read the music tripos. While at Cambridge he attended choral services held at King's College Chapel, situated next door to Clare. He began his professional career as a musician by joining the London Sinfonietta, where he was the chorus master.

== Musical career ==
Wearing is an accomplished musician who edited the works of Orlande de Lassus. Wearing sang at Westminster Cathedral as a tenor lay clerk for many years and also had a career as a chorus master, working as such at Covent Garden and with the London Sinfonietta Chorus.

In 1968, Wearing founded the Europa Singers of London, an amateur choir specialising in music of the 17th, 18th and 20th centuries. It won critical approval, especially for performances of the Vespro della Beata Vergine. In 1977, it gave the first performance in the Russian Cathedral of Sir John Tavener's setting of the Liturgy of St. John Chrysostom with Roderick Earle as bass soloist and subsequently made a recording (Ikon Records No. 9007). The Europa Singers also competed in the XXXII Concorso Polifonico Internazionale in Arezzo in 1984, and provided choruses for operas staged by the London Opera Centre, including Lully's Alceste and Mozart's Marriage of Figaro, which was performed at Sadler's Wells.

Wearing also organised The London Lassus Ensemble, designing and staging the 1982 London Lassus Festival to commemorate the composer's 450th birthday.

While he was working at the BBC, Wearing was responsible for much of the musical content of BBC Radio 3 on 29 July 1981, the day of the wedding of Prince Charles and Diana Spencer. For that occasion, he chose to recreate, with authentic instruments and meticulously researched scores, the Bavarian royal wedding that took place in Munich on 22 February 1568. The music by Lassus, Padovano, de'Bardi, Palestrina, Gabrieli, Tallis and others was performed by the Taverner Consort, Choir and Players and the Natural Trumpet Ensemble of the Schola Cantorum Basiliensis, conducted by Andrew Parrott.

== Amnesia ==
On 27 March 1985, Wearing, then an acknowledged expert in early music at the height of his career with BBC Radio 3, contracted herpes simplex encephalitis, which attacked his central nervous system. Since then, he has been unable to store new memories. He has also been unable to associate memories effectively or to control his emotions, exhibiting unstable moods.

Wearing developed a profound case of total amnesia as a result of his illness. Because of damage to the hippocampus (an area required to transfer memories from short-term to long-term memory), he is completely unable to form lasting new memories. His memory for events lasts between seven and thirty seconds. He spends every day 'waking up' every 20 seconds or so, 'restarting' his consciousness once the timespan of his short-term memory has elapsed. During this time, he repeatedly questions why he has not seen a doctor, as he constantly believes that he has only recently awoken from a comatose state. If he is engaged in conversation, he is able to provide answers to questions, but he cannot stay in the flow of conversation for longer than a few sentences and is angered if he is asked about his current situation.

Wearing remembers little of his life before 1985. He knows, for example, that he has children from an earlier marriage, but he cannot remember their names. His love for his second wife, Deborah, whom he married the year before his illness began, is undiminished. He greets her joyously every time they meet, believing either that he has not seen her in years or that they have never met before, even though she may have just left the room momentarily. When he goes out dining with his wife, he can remember the names of food, but he cannot link them with taste, as he forgets what food he is eating by the time it has reached his mouth.

In a diary provided by his carers, Wearing was encouraged to record his thoughts. Page after page was filled with entries similar to the following:

8:31 AM: Now I am ~~really~~, ~~completely~~ awake. (~~1st Time~~)
9:06 AM: Now I am ~~perfectly~~, ~~overwhelmingly~~ awake. (~~1st Time~~)
9:34 AM: Now I am ~~superlatively~~, ~~actually~~ awake. (~~1st Time~~)

Earlier entries were usually partially crossed out, since he forgot having made an entry within minutes and dismissed the writings. He did not know how the entries were made or by whom, although he did recognise his own handwriting. Wishing to record 'waking up for the first time', he still wrote diary entries in 2007, more than 20 years after he started them.

Wearing can learn new procedures and even a few facts, not from episodic memory or encoding, but by acquiring new procedural memories through repetition. For example, having watched a certain video recording multiple times on successive days, he never had any memory of ever seeing the video or knowing the content, but he was able to anticipate certain parts of the content without remembering how he learned them.

Despite having no memory of specific musical pieces when they are mentioned by name, and an extremely limited recall of his previous musical knowledge, Wearing remains capable of playing complex piano and organ pieces, sight-reading and conducting a choir.

In a documentary broadcast in 2005, Wearing was interviewed about the experience of his condition:

You're the first human beings I've seen, the three of you. Two men and one lady. The first ... people I've seen since I've been ill. No difference between day and night. No thoughts at all. No dreams. Day and night, the same – blank. Precisely like death.

Is it very hard?

No. It's exactly the same as being dead, which is not difficult, is it? To be dead is easy. You don't do anything at all. You can't do anything, when you are dead. It's been the same. Exactly.

Do you miss your old life?

Yes. But I've never been conscious to think that. So I've never been bored or upset. I've never been anything at all, it's exactly the same as death. No dreams even. Day and night, the same.

When you miss your old life, you say, 'Yes, I miss my old life', what do you miss?

The fact that I was a musician. And in love.

== Reports ==
Wearing's case was described in a case report in the Journal of Clinical and Experimental Neuropsychology in 1995.

Wearing's wife Deborah has written a book about her husband's case entitled Forever Today.

His story was told in a 1986 documentary entitled Equinox: Prisoner of Consciousness, in which he was interviewed by Jonathan Miller. Neurologist Oliver Sacks mentions the documentary in his book The Man Who Mistook His Wife for a Hat. An updated story was told in the 2005 ITV documentary The Man with the 7 Second Memory (although Wearing's short-term memory span can be up to 30 seconds).

He was also featured in the 1988 PBS series, The Mind, in Episode 1, In Search of the Mind. A follow-up episode was aired in 1998 on the second edition of The Mind as Life Without Memory: The Case of Clive Wearing.

He also appears in the 2006 documentary series Time, where his case is used to illustrate the effect of losing one's perception of time.

His story was also told in episode No. 304 – 'Memory and Forgetting' on the show Radio Lab on New York Public Radio, WNYC.

He appears in Eric Kandel's holiday lectures on the Howard Hughes Medical Institute.

Sacks wrote about Wearing himself in a chapter in his 2007 book, Musicophilia: Tales of Music and the Brain, and an article in The New Yorker titled "The Abyss".

Sam Kean also discussed Wearing's life in the twelfth chapter of his 2014 book, The Tale of the Dueling Neurosurgeons.

Wearing's story was also featured on an episode of the TLC series Medical Incredible.

== See also ==
=== Other neurological trauma/damage cases ===
- Henry Molaison (Patient H.M.)
- Phineas Gage
- Kent Cochrane (Patient K.C)
- Scott Bolzan
- S.M. (patient)

=== Other areas ===
- Anterograde amnesia
- Cognitive neuropsychology
