= Lost Girls (non-fiction book) =

2012 non-fiction book by Caitlin Rother

- Author: Caitlin Rother
- Language: English
- Genre: Non-fiction, crime
- Publisher: Kensington Books
- Publication date: July 3, 2012
- Publication place: United States
- Pages: 420 pgs
- ISBN: 0786022183

Lost Girls is a 2012 non-fiction book by the American-Canadian author and journalist Caitlin Rother about the rape and murder of teenage girls Amber Dubois in 2009 and Chelsea King in 2010 at the hands of John Albert Gardner. It was published in July 2012 by Kensington Books. It was the author's eighth book.

== Summary ==
In 2010, Gardner, after pleading guilty, was convicted of the rapes and murders of the two teenage girls and sentenced by a San Diego County Superior Court judge to two life sentences.

The book explores how Gardner became a killer. The San Diego Reader said Lost Girls "draws a terrifying portrait of a man who was sweet and cuddly one day and a crazed killer the next." It explains how the criminal justice system allowed a previous sex offender like Gardner to commit more offenses, including those against Dubois and King.

Rother conducted an interview of Gardner in a California state prison, included in 15 pages in the book. The author also repeatedly interviewed Gardner's mother, a psychiatric nurse.

== Controversy ==
The families of the victims opted not to be interviewed for the book. In July 2012, Amber Dubois' mother Carrie McGonigle attended the book's launch event with a handful of protestors wearing "Team Amber" T-shirts and carrying a sign that read "Remember the victims" at a Barnes & Noble store in San Diego. The author, according to news reports, stopped her presentation and acknowledged McConigle, telling her she was sorry for her loss as well as sorry that the book upset her, adding that she had intended it as a tribute to her daughter and Chelsea King, and as a way to prevent similar tragedies.

The families of both victims, in a joint statement hours before the event, criticized Rother for writing a for-profit book and called on her to donate 100 percent of the proceeds to a victims charity. Rother countered with her own statement, saying, in part, that she believed it was a story that needed to be told in depth, and that she hoped to educate readers about sex offenders.

== Reception ==
Lost Girls placed No. 4 in True Crime Zine reader's poll for the Top 10 Best True Crime Books of 2012. The magazine, in a review, called the book "masterful, powerful writing." The Los Angeles Times, in its review, described it as a "deeply reported, dispassionately written attempt to determine what created that monster and predator." The San Diego Union-Tribune, where the author once worked as an investigative reporter, wrote in its review, "If ever a 'true crime' deserved a book-length study, this is certainly that crime." Southwest Riverside News Network wrote that the book is a "panoramic telling of two tragedies of two girls lost to their families and the world forever."
