= Kent Cochrane =

Canadian memory disorder patient (1951–2014)

- Born: August 5, 1951; Toronto, Ontario, Canada
- Died: March 27, 2014 (aged 62); Toronto, Ontario, Canada

Kent Cochrane (August 5, 1951 – March 27, 2014), also known as Patient K.C., was a widely studied Canadian memory disorder patient who has been used as a case study in over 20 neuropsychology papers over the span of 25 years. In 1981, Cochrane was involved in a motorcycle accident that left him with severe anterograde amnesia, as well as temporally graded retrograde amnesia. Like other amnesic patients (patient H.M., for example), Cochrane had his semantic memory intact, but lacked episodic memory with respect to his entire past. As a case study, Cochrane has been linked to the breakdown of the single-memory single-locus hypothesis regarding amnesia, which states that an individual memory is localized to a single location in the brain.

== Early life ==
Kent Cochrane was born on August 5, 1951, as the oldest of five children. He and his siblings grew up in the suburbs of Toronto, Ontario. After attending a community college to study business administration, he obtained a quality control job at a manufacturing plant, which he held until the time of his motorcycle accident.

== Accident and neurological damage ==
In October 1981, Cochrane suffered a traumatic brain injury in a motorcycle accident. Upon arrival at a hospital, Cochrane was experiencing clonic epileptic seizures and was unconscious. Surgery to remove a left-side subdural hematoma was successful. After a few days, Cochrane was able to respond to simple commands, and after a week was able to recognize his mother. A follow-up CT scan revealed a chronic bilateral frontal subdural hematoma, enlarged ventricles and sulci, and left occipital lobe infarction.

Upon arrival at a rehabilitation facility, Cochrane was able to recognize friends and family, but still exhibited slower thinking ability, as well as partial right side paralysis and vision problems with his right eye. Upon his discharge from the rehabilitation facility in July 1982, the full extent of Cochrane's neurological injuries was determined. He had severe injury to his medial temporal lobes, along with almost complete bilateral hippocampal loss. Ultimately, his neurological profile stabilized, as seen in CT scans he received once each decade following the accident.

=== Memory impairment ===
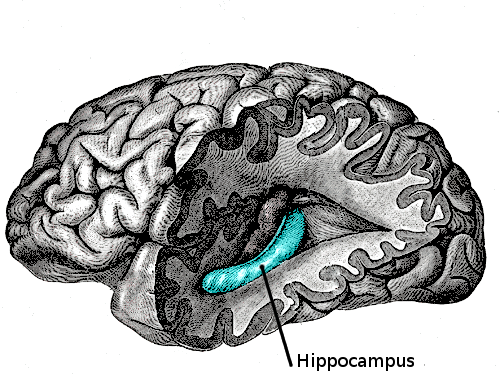
The hippocampus is the brain region located in the medial temporal lobe, responsible for forming new episodic and semantic memories.

As a result of his neurological damage, Cochrane suffered severe cognitive deficits that hindered his ability to form new episodic memories. However, both his semantic memory and noetic consciousness remained unimpaired. To illustrate this, research conducted on Cochrane has shown that he was able to recall factual information that he learned prior to his accident, such as his ability to know the difference between stalactites and stalagmites. However, Cochrane was unable to remember emotional details of events from his past such as his brother's death and a dangerous fall he had at his home.

Cochrane also suffered from severe impairment of his autonoetic consciousness. This meant that he was unable to envision himself in the future. When asked what he would be doing later in a given day, month, or even a year, he was unable to respond with an answer. Just as he could not remember being physically involved with events from his past, he was unable to imagine future events. Ultimately, he lost any memory of his current actions once his thoughts were directed elsewhere.

Neuropathologically, Cochrane suffered from both anterograde amnesia and temporally graded retrograde amnesia. Both forms of amnesia are characterized by damage to the medial temporal lobes, specifically within the hippocampal region. The trauma caused by Cochrane's accident left him with severe anterograde amnesia that has made it impossible for him to remember both new personal experiences and semantic information. As far as his temporally graded retrograde amnesia is concerned, he was considered an anomaly; in other words, his ability to recall events prior to the accident was dependent on when those events occurred. Although he could not remember personally experienced events, his semantic knowledge prior to his accident remained intact. For example, his recollection of factual information in math, history, and science, was unaffected.

== Death ==
Cochrane died on March 27, 2014, at the age of 62. The exact cause of death is unknown. His sister, Karen Casswell, said it is believed he had a heart attack or stroke. He died in his room at an assisted living facility where he lived and the family opted not to authorize an autopsy.

== Legacy ==
Studies on Cochrane have provided researchers with information on various topics in neuroscience.

=== Memory storage and processing ===
Implications of Cochrane's neuropathology have shown that damage to specific regions of the brain is associated with different forms of memory loss. As a result of damage to Cochrane's medial temporal lobe, specifically his hippocampus, research suggests that this area functions in processing episodic memory. However, damage to this area has left his semantic memory fully intact. This implies that episodic and semantic components of memory could be formed and stored separately, and thus processed by different regions of the brain.

=== Priming ===
Priming studies on Cochrane revealed that individuals with severe amnesia can display intact priming capabilities regardless of episodic memory damage. Priming involves initially exposing a subject to a word or image so that a memory of that word or image can be formed. This is meant to improve a subject's recall of that word or image when that word or image is shown at a later time. Cochrane additionally showed that priming effects can last for long periods of time; in one study, researchers presented Cochrane with a list of words, and after 12 months showed him the same words with letters missing. Cochrane was able to complete these fragmented words as successfully as a person with normal brain function who was shown the same list initially. This challenged the previous opinion that patients with anterograde amnesia are incapable of adding information to their declarative memory.

=== Semantic learning ===
Studies on Cochrane also illuminated the relationship between semantic learning and episodic memory, showing that patients with severe amnesia are capable of retaining new semantic knowledge in the absence of episodic memory. Researchers found that Cochrane was able to learn new semantic knowledge and retain it over a long period of time. In one study, researchers taught Cochrane 64 three-word sentences over multiple testing trials, and after 12 months, presented the same sentences to him with the last of the three words missing. Cochrane showed significant retention of this semantic knowledge, completing 25 of the 64 sentences. This showed that amnesic patients can learn new semantic information, although slower than normal test subjects.

Even though Cochrane could not remember the actual teaching sessions, he was able to retain the raw information—the three-word sentences—presented to him. This showed that episodic and semantic memory are independent of one another, because Cochrane's episodic memory was not intact, but his declarative memory still functioned correctly. These findings show that acquisition of semantic knowledge is possible even if episodic memory is absent.

Research on Patient Cochrane also led to greater understanding of priming in amnesics. Priming involves the exposure of a person to information under false pretenses. This information is ultimately recalled at a later period with the hope that the previous priming will improve recall ability. With respect to patient Cochrane, researchers found that successful priming is independent of both semantic and episodic memory. Episodic and semantic memory are therefore described as showing stochastic independence, ruling out the idea that Cochrane was able to retain information because certain words were of greater significance to him than others.

Studies on Cochrane's semantic learning also provided insight into the conditions that are necessary to promote successful semantic learning in amnesic patients. Researchers found that maximizing amnesics' ability to obtain new information requires efforts to minimize interference, which occurs when previously learned information prevents patients from correctly remembering subsequent information. The finding that interference significantly prevents successful semantic learning in amnesics provided explanation for why earlier experiments failed, as they did not make efforts to minimize interference.

=== Rehabilitation ===
Further studies on Cochrane tested the possibility of amnesia patients to learn information that was more complex than information acquired with priming. Researchers also examined if patients could learn information applicable to completing daily tasks. One study showed that Cochrane could learn vocabulary associated with operating a desktop computer; further studies revealed that Cochrane could actually learn commands related to computers to the extent that he was able to perform basic programming tasks on a microcomputer.

Cochrane's learning of this more complex information, however, was hyperspecific. When asked general questions about his tasks, Cochrane could not explain the meaning behind the new information he had gained about computers. Similarly, if the command instructions he had learned were slightly changed, Cochrane was unable to perform the programming tasks. This reflects that Cochrane did not learn the meaning behind the information he had learned, and that he had formed only simple stimulus response connections. Cochrane's amnesia therefore involved both information loss and impairment of the processes that allow the integration of information to create an interconnected memory. Nevertheless, Cochrane showed that severe anterograde amnesia does not restrict individuals from retaining knowledge that is more complex than information learned from priming.

== See also ==
- Cognitive neuropsychology
- Henry Molaison, formerly known as patient H.M., a person who had portions of his medial temporal lobe removed during surgery to treat epilepsy
- Clive Wearing, whose amnesia was the result of herpes simplex encephalitis
- Phineas Gage, a 19th-century railroad worker who had major personality changes after a traumatic brain injury
