= Caitlin Rother =

Canadian-American author and journalist

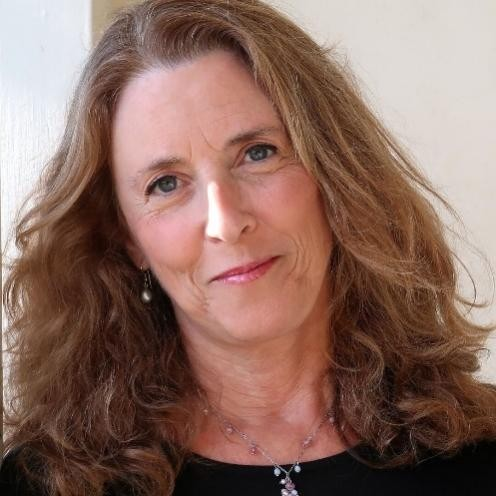
- Born: December 6, 1962 (age 63); Montreal, Quebec, Canada
- Education: University of California, Berkeley; Northwestern University
- Occupations: True crime author; novelist; journalist
- Writing career
- Period: 1987-present
- Genres: Non-fiction, fiction
- Subjects: True crime, biography
- Notable works: Lost Girls; My Life, Deleted "Down to the Bone" "Death on Ocean Boulevard"
- Website: www.caitlinrother.com

Caitlin Rother (born December 6, 1962) is a Canadian-American author of New York Times bestselling non-fiction and true crime, and a journalist who lives in San Diego, California.

== Early life and education ==
Caitlin Rother was born in Montreal, Quebec. She immigrated as a toddler to the United States in 1964 with her parents, Carole and James Rother, who went on to earn PhDs in literature from the University of California, Santa Barbara. After graduating from La Jolla High School, Rother initially attended the University of California, San Diego, before transferring to UC Berkeley, where she earned a B.S. in psychology with the class of 1984. During her senior year at Berkeley, she worked on the college newspaper, The Daily Californian, and also interned at KGO radio in San Francisco, where she got her first taste of journalism. She obtained a master’s degree from Northwestern University’s prestigious Medill School of Journalism in 1987.

== Career ==
=== Investigative Journalism ===
After finishing grad school, Rother landed an internship at States News in Washington, D.C., which then opened doors to reporting positions at The Berkshire Eagle and the Springfield Union News, both in Western Massachusetts. Rother returned to California in 1991 as a full-time freelancer for the Los Angeles Times in Ventura County, before moving on to a staff writer’s position a year later with the Daily News in the Woodland Hills community of Los Angeles. In 1993, she was hired as a staff writer by The San Diego Union Tribune, where she spent the last 13 years of her newspaper career investigating government, politics, criminal justice, social services, and mental illness.

=== Full-time Author ===
In 2005, her book Poisoned Love about Kristin Rossum's murder of her husband, Greg de Villers, was released by Pinnacle Books in 2005. The publication was updated in 2011.

Rother co-authored the memoir of Scott Bolzan, a former NFL player, titled My Life, Deleted about how Bolzan rebuilt his life after suffering permanent retrograde amnesia. The book, released by HarperCollins in October 2011, made the New York Times bestseller list for two weeks on October 23, 2011 at #16 for ebooks non-fiction and #29 for combined hardcover and ebooks non-fiction, and on October 30 at #29 for combined hardcover and ebooks non-fiction. The book was included in "Seven of Lisa Ann Walter’s favorites" in the New York Times alongside a Stephen King title in January 2023.

In July 2012, Rother wrote the book Lost Girls about convicted killer and sexual predator John Albert Gardner and his motivation for murdering San Diego-area teenagers Chelsea King and Amber Dubois. It was released by Kensington Books.

Rother’s book, Death on Ocean Boulevard: Inside the Coronado Mansion Case, about the mysterious 2011 death of Rebecca Zahau, was published in April 2021 by Kensington Books under its Citadel Press imprint.

In November 2021, the film and TV rights to Death on Ocean Boulevard were acquired by Untitled Entertainment and early production began on a limited series based on the book. Rother serves as an executive producer on the project.

=== Writing instructor, research consultant and coach ===
Rother taught writing courses at UCSD Extension from 2008 to 2017, including creative writing workshops, narrative non-fiction, journalism and interviewing. During that period, she also taught writing workshops at San Diego Writers, Ink.

== Crime commentator ==
She has been featured on Murderous Affairs, Deadly Sins, True Crime with Aphrodite Jones, On the Case with Paula Zahn, Wicked Attraction, Demons in the City of Angels, Crime Expose with Nancy O’Dell, The Perfect Murder, Blood Relatives, Deadly Affairs, Snapped, Deadly Women, on cable networks including Investigation Discovery, HBO Max, Netflix, Lifetime, Oxygen, Reelz, HLN, and A&E.

== Books ==
=== Non-fiction ===
- Down to the Bone: A Missing Family’s Murder and the Elusive Quest for Justice: This work of investigative journalism explores the mysterious disappearance of the McStay family, the discovery of their remains nearly four years later, the two flawed investigations into their case, and the holes, conflicts and disparities in the prosecution’s case that put Charles “Chase” Merritt on death row for their murder. (Kensington/Citadel 2025), (ISBN 978-0-8065-4262-1)
- Body Parts: This book chronicles the life of serial killer Wayne Adam Ford, a long-haul trucker who raped and murdered four women, dismembering two of them, then turned himself in. The updated edition was updated with the identification of his first victim, Kerry Anne Cummings, via genetic genealogy, 25 years after her murder. (Kensington/Pinnacle, 2009; Kensington/Citadel, updated and reissued 2025) ISBN 978-0-8065-4391-8
- Death On Ocean Boulevard: Inside the Coronado Mansion Case (April 2021): This tells the story behind the mysterious death of Rebecca Zahau, from her early life through the investigation and civil trial into her death. (ISBN 978-0806540894)
- Secrets, Lies, and Shoelaces: A Story of Hardship and Healing (Harmonic Convergence, 2018) (ISBN 978-0-692-12770-4)
- Hunting Charles Manson: This book provides new and historical information about the horrific high-profile series of ritualistic murders committed by the Manson Family cult in the late 1970s, which left residents of Los Angeles terrified. (Thomas Nelson, 2018), by Lis Wiehl with Caitlin Rother, (ISBN 978-0-7180-9208-5)
- Love Gone Wrong (Notorious USA, 2016), also sold as three Kindle shorts (Kill Me Some More, Dead on Delivery, and A Complicated Woman): A collection of 10 magazine-length stories about current and historical murder cases in South Carolina, Georgia and Florida.
- Then No One Can Have Her (October 2015): The story behind the brutal murder of therapist and artist Carol Kennedy by her ex-husband of 35 days, Steve DeMocker, an investment broker and sex addict. (ISBN 978-0-7860-3257-0)
- I'll Take Care of You (January 2014): The story of the murder of multimillionaire and entrepreneur Bill McLaughlin by his conwoman fiancée Nanette Johnston and her lover, NFL-wannabe Eric Naposki. (ISBN 978-0786032556)
- Lost Girls (July 2012): Chronicles the rape and murder of two San Diego-area teens, Amber Dubois and Chelsea King, by sexual predator John Gardener, and the investigation that exposed his heinous acts. (ISBN 978-0786022182)
- My Life Deleted (Oct 2011): The story of former NFL football player Scott Bolzan’s fall in a bathroom, resulting in a severe brain injury that wiped out his entire long-term memory and sense of self, followed by his physical and emotional recovery and his work to form new memories. (ISBN 978-0062025470)
- Deadly Devotion/Where Hope Begins (July 2011) originally published in hardcover as Where Hope Begins: The story of the Marcus Wesson case, a mentally ill man who had children with his daughters and nieces and physically abused his sons, then ordered his daughter to shoot nine of them in the head while the Fresno police were outside the house. (ISBN 978-1439131510)
- Dead Reckoning (Feb 2011): Chronicles the murder of Tom and Jackie Hawks by Skylar DeLeon and her crew of cohorts, who tied the couple to the anchor of their own boat and threw them overboard—alive—motivated by Skylar’s powerful desire for money to pay for gender reassignment surgery. (ISBN 978-0786022175)
- Twisted Triangle (April 2009): A Famous Crime Writer, a Lesbian Love Affair, and the FBI Husband’s Violent Revenge: The story behind the case of married FBI agents Margo and Gene Bennett, the latter of whom tried to kill his estranged wife and her minister after she had an affair with novelist Patricia Cornwell. (ISBN 978-0470442517)
- Body Parts (March 2009) (ISBN 978-0786019540)
- Poisoned Love (July 2005): The story of the Krisin Rossum murder case, the San Diego County toxicologist who was convicted of poisoning her husband, then staging a suicide scene by sprinkling red rose petals over his body. (ISBN 978-0786022199)

=== Fiction ===
- Naked Addiction (Nov 2007): Detective Ken Goode is forced to deal with his own demons as he investigates several murders in La Jolla and Pacific Beach, including a young female victim who looks exactly like his mother did before she killed herself when he was only six years old. (ISBN 978-0843959956)
- Hooked: Homicide detective Ken Goode and investigative reporter Katrina Chopin fight a sexual attraction as they compete to solve their independent investigations into two suspicious deaths in the wealthy beach community of La Jolla, exposing the corrupt underbelly of the beautiful enclave. (Thomas & Mercer, February 2026), (ISBN 978-1-6625-3235-1)
