= The Icepick Surgeon =

2021 nonfiction book by Sam Kean

The Icepick Surgeon: Murder, Fraud, Sabotage, Piracy, and Other Dastardly Deeds Perpetrated in the Name of Science
- Cover of The Icepick Surgeon
- Author: Sam Kean
- Language: English
- Genre: Nonfiction, History, Popular science
- Publisher: Little, Brown and Company/Hachette Publishers
- Publication date: July 13, 2021
- Publication place: United States
- Media type: Print, eBook, Audio
- Pages: 368
- ISBN: 978-0316496506
- Website: http://samkean.com/books/the-icepick-surgeon/

The Icepick Surgeon: Murder, Fraud, Sabotage, Piracy, and Other Dastardly Deeds Perpetrated in the Name of Science is a 2021 American nonfiction book written by Sam Kean and published by Little, Brown and Company. It features a series of stories throughout the past several centuries involving abuses and crimes committed by scientists in the pursuit of knowledge at all costs. Extensive documents and other historical sources, among additional facts portrayed through footnotes, are used to discuss the impact of various individuals from their actions, along with an appendix contemplating on the potential future crimes that may be committed by new scientific advancements.

== Content ==
The book is split into chapters generally in chronological order. It begins and ends with the same quote from Albert Einstein, which reads "Most people say that it is the intellect which makes a great scientist. They are wrong: it is character."

A prologue to the book has its own apocryphal story about Egyptian Queen Cleopatra originally written by the philosopher Plutarch. It claims that the Queen did experiments on both criminals and her own servants involving the effects of poisons and whether one could determine the sex of a child before it was born. The first chapter discusses the history of pirate William Dampier who used his thievery as a source for biological research on animals through his travels. While his work would serve as a precursor for the studies done by Charles Darwin, Dampier is also remembered as having been a prolific thief and murderer. The second chapter is an inspection of how Henry Smeathman went to Sierra Leone for his work in entomology and became a contributing part of the slave trade in the region, which Kean also notes is the contributive taint infecting many early scientists and the trinkets they ended up collecting for museums. The third chapter covers the grave robbing activities of John Hunter and, years later, of Robert Knox and his hiring of individuals to provide cadavers for university research.

The fifth chapter looks into the activities of Thomas Edison and his competition against alternating current producers versus his direct current technologies. In order to present the alternating current as dangerous, Edison killed 44 dogs, 6 calves, and 2 horses in a purposefully misleading exhibition. The sixth chapter considers the scientific conflict between Edward Drinker Cope and Othniel Charles Marsh, who actively sabotaged and committed fraud against each other in order to prove themselves the better paleontologist. The seventh chapter goes over the horrific actions of Nazi scientists during World War II. It also uses them as context for the other people discussed in the book to consider the idea of whether good deeds outweigh bad actions. The eighth chapter tells the story of Walter Freeman and his lobotomy work, where he acted as the eponymous icepick surgeon by devising a new method for conducting lobotomies involving an icepick inserted through the eye socket in order to cut the limbic lobe from the rest of the brain. Despite his claims of curing patients, a significant number died from his method of operation. The tenth chapter is on the torture and interrogation methods of Henry Murray who created an abusive study used on volunteer students to determine the effectiveness of his verbal torture methods. His work is most well known for being used on one particular volunteer, Theodore Kaczynski, who went on to become the Unabomber.

Footnotes are included throughout the book to include extra details about various subject matter. They are often paired with a URL address link to podcast episodes also covering the people discussed in the book. An appendix is used as a repository for additional material and scientific individuals and crimes committed beyond what was in the book, along with possible future crimes in science with new technologies and areas of exploration.

== Critical reception ==
Writing in The Washington Post, Lucinda Robb described the book as having "the flair of a beach thriller and the thoughtfulness of philosophy" while being both "delightful" and "highly readable" and each page having a "wealth of information and juicy details, all held together with virtuoso storytelling". Brandy Schillace for the Wall Street Journal noted the "gems of phraseology" that Kean included in the book, but that rather than just being a "gathering of amusing vignettes", he successfully managed to get across the "systemic ways that early sins have crept into the heart of science and medicine today" through his descriptions.

Publishers Weekly stated in a review that Kean "argues convincingly" on his premise that the individuals and events discussed in the book are uniquely terrible in what they did for the pursuit of scientific knowledge, concluding that The Icepick Surgeon is an "engrossing look at crimes often committed by otherwise moral people [that] deserves a wide readership". Library Journal's Kate Bellody described the work as a "witty, thought-provoking book" and that it serves as a "lively, compelling addition to the true crime and popular science genres". Deborah Blum reviewed the book for Science and noted that, while the subject matter is "murky, wide-ranging, and complex" and that there are several topics that Kean does not touch on including sexual misconduct in the sciences, he still manages to "ultimately succeed in touching on many issues that have fueled doubts about scientists". Writing for Ars Technica, Diana Gitig considered how the book is sometimes excessive in the amount of detail and number of centuries-old documents that are focused on, but despite the fact that the book "raises more questions than it answers", it manages to showcase that as a "hallmark of good experiments—as well as good books about science and scientists".
