= Kristin Rossum =

American toxicologist and convicted murderer

- Born: Kristin Margrethe Rossum; October 25, 1976 (age 50); Memphis, Tennessee
- Occupation: Toxicologist
- Spouse: Gregory T. de Villers (1999-2000; his death)
- Parent(s): Ralph and Constance Rossum
- Status: Imprisoned
- Criminal charge: First degree murder
- Penalty: Life sentence without the possibility of parole

Kristin Margrethe Rossum (born October 25, 1976) is an American former toxicologist who was convicted of the murder of her husband, Gregory T. de Villers, who died from a lethal dose of fentanyl on November 6, 2000. Rossum is serving a life sentence at the Central California Women's Facility in Chowchilla.

== Background ==
Kristin Rossum was born in Memphis, Tennessee. She grew up in Claremont, California, the oldest child of Ralph and Constance Rossum. Her father is a professor and her mother worked at Azusa Pacific University. She has two brothers.

In 1991, after her father accepted the position of President of Hampden–Sydney College, the family moved to Virginia and Kristin enrolled at the all-girls St. Catherine's School in Richmond. There, Rossum began drinking beer and smoking cigarettes. She also tried marijuana, but said it had little effect. Starting in 1992, she began using methamphetamine.

In 1994, Rossum moved back to California and enrolled part-time at the University of Redlands and moved into a dormitory on campus, but eventually left following a relapse. After overcoming her addiction and beginning her relationship with Greg de Villers, Rossum enrolled at San Diego State University and graduated with honors in 1998. After graduating, she worked as a toxicologist at the San Diego County medical examiner's office. Rossum and de Villers married in 1999. The following year, she began an extramarital affair with her boss, Dr. Michael Robertson.

== Murder ==
In late 2000, de Villers had learned about both the affair and her resumption of her meth habit, threatening to expose both to the medical examiner if she did not quit her job. Robertson, who also knew Rossum had relapsed, learned of this threat prior to the death of de Villers.

On November 6, 2000, just after 9:15 p.m., Rossum dialled 9-1-1 and reported that de Villers had committed suicide. Paramedics found him lying unresponsive on the couple's bed, which was sprinkled with red rose petals; he was pronounced dead on arrival at the hospital. Rossum told authorities he had committed suicide. Despite her claims, de Villers's family – particularly his brother, Jerome – were adamant that he was not suicidal. However, San Diego police were initially reluctant to open an investigation.

One month after de Villers' death, Rossum and Robertson were both fired from the medical examiner's office – Rossum for hiding her meth habit, and Robertson for enabling her meth habit, as well as for fraternization with a subordinate.

Due to potential conflicts of interest, the San Diego medical examiner outsourced de Villers' autopsy to an outside lab in Los Angeles. The tests showed de Villers had seven times the lethal dose of fentanyl in his system. Under questioning, Rossum told detectives that her husband had been depressed before he died, while her father stated that he seemed to be deeply distressed and that he drank heavily on the night he died. As the investigation continued, police learned about Rossum's relapse, and about a phone call she made to de Villers' employer telling them he would not be coming in to work the day of his murder.

== Trial and conviction ==
On June 25, 2001, seven months after de Villers' death, Rossum was arrested and charged with murder. On January 4, 2002, her parents posted her $1.25 million bail.

At trial, the prosecution contended that Rossum murdered her husband to keep him from telling her bosses about both her affair and her use of meth stolen from the drug lab. Defense attorneys argued that de Villers was suicidal and poisoned himself. Rossum's brother-in-law, Jerome de Villers, testified that it was difficult to believe his brother had committed suicide because he hated drugs. Rossum's account of the day of death was that she went to work in the morning, then returned in the early afternoon to check on her husband and serve him a bowl of soup. She returned to work, then came home around 7 P.M. where she said she showered and shaved her legs. Upon drying herself, she went to the bedroom where she found her husband not breathing, and called 911. The 9-1-1 tape played in court appeared to indicate Rossum was administering CPR to her husband. The prosecution had presented a store card receipt from Vons where it was shown she had acquired a single red rose. Crumpled rose petals were found on de Villers' corpse akin to the film American Beauty. The defense claimed de Villers had put the petals on himself for his final action out of suicidal grief, which was refuted by the prosecution who argued that a man of de Villers' build having overdosed on fentanyl would lack the energy to accomplish this. The clinching evidence was the credit card receipt, having been timestamped 12:42 P.M., the same time Rossum having claimed to be at home nursing her husband.

On November 12, 2002, Rossum was found guilty of first degree murder. On December 12, she was sentenced to life in prison without the possibility for parole, and a $10,000 fine. She was transferred to the Central California Women's Facility in Chowchilla, the largest women's correctional facility in the U.S.

== Recent events ==
In 2006, both Rossum and San Diego County were named as defendants in a wrongful death lawsuit filed by de Villers' family. A jury ordered Rossum to pay more than $100 million in punitive damages, while San Diego County was ordered to pay $1.5 million. The family had originally asked for $50 million in punitive damages, but jurors awarded double that amount after estimating Rossum could have made $60 million from selling the rights to her story.

John Gomez, the lawyer for the de Villers family, acknowledged that the family may never see the money, but wanted to make sure Rossum does not profit from her crime.

A judge later reduced the punitive damages award to $10 million, but allowed the $4.5 million compensatory award to stand.

In September 2010, a three-judge panel of the 9th U.S. Circuit Court of Appeals ruled that Rossum's lawyers should have challenged the prosecution's assertion, by doing its own tests, that she poisoned her husband with fentanyl. The panel ordered a San Diego federal court to hold a hearing into whether the defense's error could have affected the trial's outcome.

On September 13, 2011, the U.S. Court of Appeals withdrew its opinion and replaced it with a one-paragraph statement that under a new Supreme Court precedent, Rossum's petition was denied.

Following his termination by the San Diego medical examiner's office, Robertson returned to his home in Brisbane, Queensland, Australia, ostensibly to care for his ailing mother.

In September 2013, the San Diego Reader reported that, in 2006, prosecutors secretly filed a criminal complaint charging Robertson – who was named as an unindicted co-conspirator at Rossum's trial – with one count of conspiracy to obstruct justice. If the Australian government elected to extradite Robertson or he voluntarily returned to the US, he could face up to three years in prison. As of 2014, Robertson was running a forensic consulting service in Brisbane.

== In popular culture ==
Rossum was featured in episodes of true crime documentary series such as Oxygen's true crime series Snapped, truTV's The Investigators, and Investigation Discovery's Deadly Women. Her story was also featured on newsmagazines such as CBS's 48 Hours.

Caitlin Rother, who was interviewed for each episode, wrote Poisoned Love, a book about the case: ISBN 0-7860-1714-7. Another book about Rossum was Deadly American Beauty by John Glatt: ISBN 0-312-98419-7.
