= Scott Bolzan =

American football player (born 1962)

- Born: Scott Louis Bolzan; July 25, 1962 (age 64); Chicago, Illinois, U.S.
- Education: Northern Illinois University
- Occupations: Former NFL and USFL player Motivational speaker
- Spouse: Joan Bolzan (m. 1984)
- Website: https://thebolzans.com

Scott Louis Bolzan (born July 25, 1962) is an American author, entrepreneur, and former NFL and USFL football player. In December 2008, he incurred a brain injury which he claims has left him with profound retrograde amnesia. Scott, along with Joan Bolzan and Caitlin Rother, has written a book titled My Life: Deleted, which was published by HarperCollins on October 4, 2011.

== Early life and football career ==
Scott Bolzan attended Northern Illinois University from 1980 to 1984 on a full athletic scholarship; there, he played football for the Northern Illinois Huskies.

Bolzan was drafted in May 1984 by the New England Patriots in the 9th round. He was waived by the Patriots in August of that year. He went on to play for the Memphis Showboats in the USFL in 1985. Afterwards, Bolzan was picked up by the Cleveland Browns in May 1985 and later waived in September 1985. He was re-signed later in the month and cut in October. Bolzan was signed by the Browns again in May 1986. He was injured in August 1986 and retired soon after.

== Entrepreneurship ==
After his football career ended due to an injury, Bolzan entered the financial services field where he owned his own financial planning firm specializing in insurance and investments. After moving to Arizona in 1993, he took up aviation, and later developed West Jet Aircraft (no relation to WestJet Express or to Canadian airline WestJet) as a charter company specializing in the charter of Lear Jets and King Airs in the Scottsdale area of Arizona. He sold West Jet aircraft in February 2008 and founded another company named Legendary Jets shortly thereafter.

== Brain injury ==
On December 17, 2008, Scott Bolzan slipped in the men's bathroom at his place of work. He says his last "actual memory" was "my feet going above my head". The fall caused a severe concussion. Bolzan was initially told his memory loss was normal and temporary, but as months passed by and he still did not remember any part of his life before the fall, he revealed his condition to his wife and they sought help from neurologists.

A SPECT scan of Bolzan's brain showed that he had no blood flow to his right temporal lobe—the part of the brain that stores long-term memory. Blood flow to the front of his brain on both sides was also dramatically reduced. He had brain atrophy, which killed brain cells and damaged connections between them. The loss of blood flow caused Bolzan to have an unusually severe case of retrograde amnesia. Dr. Teresa Lanier, Bolzan's primary physician, has said "It would basically have to be a miracle for him to one day wake up and have complete and intact memory of everything he has lost. That's probably just never going to happen."

Bolzan's wife has tried to help him remember parts of his life since his fall, showing him photographs of key events in his life in hopes of jogging his memory. Along with memories of his personal life, he has lost memories of historical events and basic interpersonal relationship concepts. He did not understand birthdays or the relationship between a husband and wife. He had no reference points. He did, however, remember basic life tasks, like using eating utensils and how to drive a car.

Bolzan has appeared on talk shows such as Dr. Phil, The View, Fox & Friends, Good Morning America, Huckabee, The Doctors, Nightline, and a guest appearance on Couples Therapy. Bolzan has also been a guest on numerous syndicated radio shows and local news stations.

The New York Post published an article on October 9, 2011, reporting that a doctor who examined Bolzan after his fall stated that Bolzan was possibly "feigning his alleged memory deficits", explaining that it is questionable that an injury to one part of the brain could affect all the different memories distributed among the organ, while not damaging his cognitive abilities or his ability to form new memories. The article also cited other neurologists who, while having not examined Bolzan, stated that his amnesia violates fundamental knowledge of neurobiology, in that old memories are more resistant to brain damage than recent ones, in contrast to Bolzan's case.

== See also ==
- Clive Wearing
