= The Disappearing Spoon =

2010 book by Sam Kean

- Author: Sam Kean
- Published: July 12, 2010 (hardback)
- Publisher: Little, Brown and Company
- Publication place: United States
- Media type: Print, e-book, audiobook
- Pages: 400 pages (hardback)
- ISBN: 0316051640 (hardback)

The Disappearing Spoon: And Other True Tales of Madness, Love, and the History of the World from the Periodic Table of the Elements, is a 2010 book by science reporter Sam Kean. The book was first published in hardback on July 12, 2010, through Little, Brown and Company and was released in paperback on June 6, 2011, through Little, Brown and Company's imprint Back Bay Books.

The book focuses on the history of the periodic table by way of short stories showing how a number of chemical elements affected their discoverers, for either good or bad. People discussed in the book include the physicist and chemist Marie Curie, whose discovery of radium almost ruined her career; the writer Mark Twain, whose short story "Sold to Satan" featured a devil who was made of radium and wore a suit made of polonium; and the theoretical physicist Maria Goeppert-Mayer, who earned a Nobel Prize in Physics for her groundbreaking work, yet continually faced opposition owing to her sex. The book's title refers to gallium, whose 85 °F (29 °C) melting point would cause a spoon of that metal to "disappear" if placed in a cup of hot tea, by melting into a puddle at the bottom of the cup.

== Contents ==
=== Chapter 1. Geography of elements ===
Sam Kean begins this book by explaining the basics of the periodic table and how it works. He explains the set-up of the table and why it is organized the way it is. He emphasizes the importance of its organization and justifies why it must be this way. He discusses how the periodic table would not function if it were not for the layout. He states that an element's position describes its function and strength. He describes the table of elements as a castle and the elements as bricks to build this castle. He then discusses how the periodic table contains, and is organized into, metals, gases, noble gases, halogens, etc.

Kean also discusses how ions work overall. He describes how ions are made when atoms connect with electrons by either giving electrons or taking electrons to another molecule to obtain a net electrical charge. He states the importance the net electrical charge has on the elements and the periodic table placement. He covers the electron shells and how certain elements hide electrons and do not share and, while others do share. Kean describes electron behavior as being the guiding point to what forms the period table. Toward the end of this chapter, he speaks of Maria Goeppert-Mayer and her contributions to science.

=== Chapter 2. The fathers of the periodic table ===
The author focuses on the relationships between carbon, silicon, and germanium. He explains how carbon is the backbone of amino acids and the building blocks to everything. He discusses that because of carbon, amino acids all stick together. Then, he describes the carbon element and how it wants to fill its outer energy level with eight electrons so it attaches to four atoms since carbon already has four electrons.

Next, Kean describes silicon. In general, he states that they are cousins because silicon mimics carbon in the sense that it also seeks to attach to four more atoms to fill its energy levels. The big issue that silicon encounters is that silicon does not have the life-sustaining abilities like carbon to attach to oxygen. Silicon dioxide can be fatal and carbon dioxide is not. Moving forward in this chapter Kean starts to describe Germanium and its similarities to silicon. Both of these elements are semiconductors and because of this they can be used for technological purposes. Sam describes Germanium as "The black sheep of the family" because silicon is used for the technology instead of germanium. Unfortunately for Germanium, silicon provided a much better use for electronics and was used when men were sent to the moon and when computers and cell phones were made instead of germanium.

=== Chapter 3. All in the family: The Genealogy of elements ===
The author examines Robert Bunsen and his history. Bunsen had passion for arsenic but an explosion left him half-blind for the rest of his life and because of this he created the Bunsen burner. He discusses many people who contributed to the periodic table, including Dmitri Mendeleev, the man accredited for creating the first periodic table. Mendeleev predicted other elements that were yet discovered. He put the 62 known elements into columns and rows but he was not the only scientist to attempt this. Julius Lothar Meyer also worked on his own periodic table. Mendeleev had left blanks in his table where the lanthanides are because he did not know what elements were to go there. The missing elements were later found in the mine called Ytterby in Sweden. Researchers such as Johan Gadolin isolated clusters of lanthanides along with many scientists who made the trip to Ytterby to find the missing elements. Overall seven lanthanides elements were found and six of them were predicted by Mendeleev's table of elements.

=== Chapter 4. Where atoms come from: "We are all star stuff" ===
The author talks about theories of the origins of elements and discusses the big bang theory and how all elements were created. He then discusses the confusion about big bang caused by research of the stars and how certain elements are only found in stars. Kean states that scientists are confused due to young stars having only helium and hydrogen while older stars had dozens of elements. He then explains the famous 1957 paper called B2FH that explains stars and their elements. He summarises this document and then explains Earth's elements, the supernovae, the Solar System, the formation of gas giants and the formation of rocky planets.

=== Chapter 5. Elements in times of war ===
Kean discusses elements and their involvement in chemical warfare in World Wars I and II. Kean gives a brief summary of the wars and their beginnings, linking them to the Trojan wars. He describes how the Spartans threw bundles of wood, pitch, and stinky sulfur into Athens to force the Athenians out but failed. Even though all of the scientifically advanced countries except the US signed the Hague Convention in 1899 to ban chemical weapons in war, the deal was broken. Countries secretly investigated the uses of bromine and chlorine.

Ultimately, Kean examines people such as Fritz Haber, who developed ammonia to help the agricultural field to prevent people from starving to death, but instead ammonia was used to help Germany build nitrogen explosives. The author describes the effects that this had on Fritz's life and family. Towards the end of this chapter Kean explains the things countries did to obtain the elements for weaponry and killing.

=== Chapter 6. Completing the table..with a bang ===
Kean starts by discussing Henry Moseley, who was famous for finding a mathematical relationship between the wavelengths of x-rays, the number of protons an element has, and the elements atomic number. He also built an electron gun that helped sort radioactive elements which by doing so also was able to disprove newly found elements. Moseley died on the field during World War I and his death caused scientists to search for the missing elements Moseley had discussed. The periodic table expanded as more elements were discovered. Following the timeline, Kean also discussed how the neutron was also discovered and how people became interested in radioactivity and began doing research. Upcoming radioactivity research led to the Manhattan Project to develop along with the hopes of building an atomic bomb. The Manhattan Project combined with the Monte Carlo method was successful and atomic bombs were able to be created. The Monte Carlos then strove for the development of computers and more nuclear weapons. This led to the creation of gamma radiation bombs. Kean closes the chapter by explaining how Manhattan Project veterans came up with bombs using cobalt capable of annihilating humanity and also explains the deal between the US and Soviet governments to lose any nuclear war.

=== Chapter 7. Competitive elements: Extending the table, expanding the cold war ===
Sam Kean mostly emphasizes the discoveries of the last elements in the periodic table. Glenn Seaborg and Albert Ghiorso with join efforts worked at UC Berkeley and found at least one-sixth of the elements on the table, the most elements than anyone else in history. Discovering elements involved many experiments where one little mistake could ruin the whole experiment and waste thousands of dollars. Kean discussed the many arguments and fights raised for the naming rights of these final elements. The Russians found element 104 in 1964 before the Berkeley team did and later discovered element 105 but fights arose when both teams found element 106 just months apart and the big feuds for naming rights began. The disagreements ran into the 1990s, but the fights and feuds were so extreme that IUPAC (International Union of Pure and Applied Chemistry) had to give the final names. They studied the data of both teams and came up with a list of names. Both teams had lists of names they wanted. Seaborg was alive when an element was named after him and he was the first to be alive when such an occurrence happened.

=== Chapter 8. From Physics to Biology ===
The author discusses the importance awareness of the details of the periodic table. Doing so could have avoided the two biggest mistakes in science history made by Linus Pauling and Emilio Segre. The author begins to discuss element 43, which was allegedly found many times by various scientists, but was actually first found by Emilio Segre. Then he talks about the basic mistakes Linus Pauling made when trying to discover the true form of the DNA strand. Instead, James Watson, Francis Crick, and Rosalind Franklin's research led to the discovery of the true shape and form of the DNA strand.

=== Chapter 9. Poisoner's corridor: "Ouch-Ouch" ===
Elements such as thallium, lead, polonium, cadmium and bismuth- otherwise known as the poisonous elements- are discussed. Cadmium's huge effects on Japan were discussed. Cadmium was constantly dumped into waters, usually when mining for zinc. The constant dumping eventually led to a poisoning of the rice plants due to the poisoned water. This, consequently, led to the development of a disease called "itai-itai" or ouch-ouch, where people suffered tremendous pain, liver failure, and extremely damaged weakened bones. It took a very long time for people to discover the relation between this horrible disease and the poisonous water. Sam discussed thallium and ways it was used for killing people. The author then discusses that bismuth has a half-life of 20 quintillion years, meaning that it will live on more than other elements.

Kean mentions people who experimented with the poisonous elements mentioned, such as David Hahn who tried to create Uranium-233 in his backyard with the lithium from batteries and thorium and was soon after arrested for attempting. Kean discusses Graham Young, who experimented by putting this element in people's food and drinks. He was sent to a mental institution, but when he left, he continued poisoning people. He only killed three of the many people he poisoned.

=== Chapter 10. Take two elements, call me in the morning ===
Kean goes over many different uses for various elements. He discusses the positive effects that eating off silver platters had on officers in early times. The author then discusses Tycho Brahe, who lost the bridge of his nose in a drunken sword duel in 1564. Kean states that he ordered a nose made out of silver and it helped aesthetically and it helped avoid infections. Kean then moves on to speak of the uses for copper. He states that copper is used for plumbing, ducts, and tubing in buildings. Next he discusses Gadolinium and how it has unpaired electrons making it one of the most magnetic elements and is used in modern-day science by helping MRIs detect tumors. Gadolinium also can be used to attack cancer tumors because of its array of unpaired electrons. Kean states that this drug can one day help make surgical fixes without any actual surgical interventions. Towards the middle of the chapter, Kean discusses Louis Pasteur and his findings about chirality. Pasteur developed pasteurization and created an anti-rabies vaccine. Towards the end of this chapter Kean examines Gerhard Domagk and his contributions to the finding of the first antibacterial drug and bacterial birth control.

=== Chapter 11. How elements deceive ===
Kean discusses how elements deceive. He tells of the deaths of NASA technicians during a simulation. On March 19, 1981, five technicians were working on a simulation spacecraft at NASA's Cape Canaveral headquarters for a routine system check. They were cleared to enter a spacecraft area but two seconds after they did, they all collapsed and when the rescue team arrived, only three were saved. The rest died of anoxia due to a pure-nitrogen atmosphere. The author then moves on to talk about titanium and its many uses in implants to avoid infection and its deceitful methods to effect bones' growth onto it. Kean then goes over beryllium. He states that when ingested it can seem very sweet even though it is toxic. It also causes acute beryllium disease. An example of someone who had this disease because he worked a lot with this element is Enrico Fermi. When he died at the age of 53 of pneumonia, his lungs were completely shredded due to the beryllium. However, Fermi died of stomach cancer. It was Herbert L. Anderson who died as Kean described, at age 74, in this uncited error. Kean finishes this chapter by discussing Iodine and its health benefits, India's blindness to the benefits of Iodine and he discusses Gandhi's salt march.

=== Chapter 12. Political elements ===
Sam Kean examines the interactions of elements and politics. Kean then speaks of the lives and findings of Marie Curie and Pierre Curie. In the 1890s, the Curies began their well known work on radioactive elements. Their work and findings earned Marie and Pierre Curie a shared Nobel Prize in physics in 1903. Then they found two new radioactive elements, polonium and radium, after boiling down pitchblende. They were to win another shared Nobel Prize but Pierre died so only Marie received the prize. Kean then talks about their daughter, Irene Joliot-Curie and her husband Frédéric Joliot-Curie. Irene found a method to convert tame elements into artificially radioactive elements by bombarding them with subatomic particles and due to this discovery, she earned a Nobel Prize in 1935. She developed leukemia later in life due to inhaling an exploded capsule from her lab. Lastly, Kean mentions the injustice done to Lise Meitner and her tremendous work with Otto Hahn. They both found element 91 known as brevium, but then it was changed to protactinium. As Lise was a woman and with the advent of World War II, she was not awarded then or later. Otto Hahn received a Nobel Prize and did not mention her.

=== Chapter 13. Elements as money ===
Sam Kean discusses the elements being used as currency in the past and he compares them to currency today being just paper money and coins made out of zinc, copper and nickel. Kean then talks about the story of King Midas and his "golden touch". He then continues to speak of the similarities and differences between brass and gold. The author discusses the craziness that came with the gold rush and everyone's search for and desire to obtain gold. Kean explains the story behind the gold rush in Australia in 1896, and speaks of "fool's gold".

Furthermore, Kean speaks of another craze that rose with tellurium because once people realized that tellurium could be broken down to find gold within, they stopped discarding tellurium. Kean then speaks of the world's serious problems with counterfeit money.

In Europe, Europium and fluorescing dye are combined on Euros. When subjected to a special laser, a charcoal sketch of Europe appears to show an authentic euro. Lastly, he discusses aluminum and how, before it was used for commercial purposes, it cost more than gold.

=== Chapter 14. Artistic elements ===
Kean explains the symbiosis of funding and science. He describes how that as science became more costly, only well-funded individuals are capable of great discoveries. Kean then discusses the work of Johann Wolfgang von Goethe a writer of science and politics. He was known for making brave claims and one was of double replacement reactions. These claims he made benefited the career of the scientist Johann Dobrereiner. Lastly, Kean talks about Robert Lowell, who was known for his madness and many outbreaks. But once he was medicated with Lithium, he changed, his work changed and people's reaction towards him changed.

=== Chapter 15. An element of madness ===
Kean introduces pathological science by mentioning William Crookes. Crookes lost his brother Philip at sea and Crookes and his family became overwhelmed with grief. They turned to spiritualism to express their grief. Crookes and his family became frequent attendees of the séances to try to communicate with his brother. He published "Notes of an Enquiry into the Phenomena Called Spiritual" in 1874 and his coworkers thought he was crazy. Crookes eventually left the spiritual research and returned to science and focused on other topics. Kean then talks about cold fusion research by Stanley Pons and Martin Fleischmann. Cold fusion was supposed to be an efficient new source of energy without any emissions. Pons and Fleischmann discovered this new power source and ran many of the same experiments to confirm their results, but none of their tests had the same results. However, the men held a press conference to announce their new discovery. Cold fusion attracted much attention, but it turned out to be a fraud.

=== Chapter 16. Chemistry way, way below zero ===
Kean tells the story of Robert Falcon Scott's expedition to the South Pole. Many scientists were attempting to be the first people to reach the South Pole, but a team led by Roald Amundsen had already reached it. The Amundsen team safely returned from the journey, but Scott's team was delayed at the pole due to snow flurries and fuel supplies lost due to the low temperatures. Robert Falcon Scott and his companions died on the South Pole.

Throughout the chapter, Kean discussed elements that were put through extreme temperatures to be able to get a sample. Xenon and krypton were put to temperatures as low as −240 F. Sam explains how laser beams are produced by yttrium and neodymium. Kean states that the most powerful laser has more power than the US and it uses crystals of yttrium spiked with neodymium. While lasers produce visible light, masers do not, instead producing microwaves. Masers were considered impossible until Charles Townes worked on them, earning him a Nobel Prize in 1964.

=== Chapter 17. The science of bubbles ===
In this chapter, Kean discusses bubbles and Donald Glaser's study of them. Kean states that it began when Glaser thought about particle physics while drinking beer and staring at the bubbles of the beer. Glaser wanted to further research how bubbles worked, so he built a bubble chamber. When beer did not produce acceptable bubbles, he used liquid nitrogen. The research he conducted with the bubble chamber earned him a Nobel Prize at the young age of thirty-three. Kean also writes of Ernest Rutherford and the radioactivity research that led him to find a new element and beta particles. For this research and discovery he received a Nobel Prize in 1908.

=== Chapter 18. Tools of ridiculous precision ===
Kean examines perfectionism at the NIST (National Institute of Standards and Technology) and the BIPM (Bureau International des Poids et Measures). These people are responsible for defining the fundamental physical units and standards utilized throughout the world. Throughout this chapter, Kean discusses the prototype of the kilogram and a metal rod in Paris that was previously used to exactly define the meter. He also discusses the world's way of telling time nowadays compared to the old way of looking at the stars and planets. He ends the chapter by discussing increasing precision in the measurement of the fine-structure constant — the earliest measurements pegged it at 1/136, but over time it was refined to 1/137.0359. Kean discusses these topics to emphasize the measures to be precise people have taken.

=== Chapter 19. Above (and beyond) the periodic table ===
Finally, Sam Kean talks about francium, "magic elements" and the future of the periodic table. The most anyone has ever acquired of Francium is ten thousand atoms and it only lasted for twenty minutes. Since Francium is so rare, it is even more difficult to find than astatine. Were it abundant, its high levels of radiation would be lethal. The "magic elements" found by Maria Goeppert-Mayer include extra stable elements 2, 8, 20 and more. Kean talks about the "Island of stability" and the future of the periodic table. Kean states since alpha is 1/137 and Einstein's theory of relativity states that nothing can travel faster than light. There are theories that element 137 will be the final element because theoretically, any elements beyond 137 will be physically impossible to obtain or to create, but science can change.

== Reception ==
Critical reception to The Disappearing Spoon has been mostly positive. Science News and Smithsonian both praised the work for its wide appeal and writing, and Science News commented that Kean's choice to deal with topics by periods in history helped "reveal how truly elemental the elements are and explain why this chemistry book appeals to non-chemists." The New York Times was slightly more critical in their review, as they felt that the text was entertaining but leapt around too frequently in its topics.

== Translations ==
This book was translated into several languages, including the following:

- Guerres et paix chez les atomes (in French), JC Lattès, 2011, ISBN 978-2-7096-3521-9.

== See also ==
- Periodic Tales: A Cultural History of the Elements, from Arsenic to Zinc, by Hugh Aldersey-Williams
