= Patient N.A. =

Anonymous amnesia patient

Patient N.A. (born July 9, 1938) was an anonymous man from the United States who developed anterograde amnesia due to a fencing accident. The cause of his amnesia was found to be a thalamic lesion extending to the hypothalamus. Damage to the temporal cortex was also found and was suspected to be a result of an exploratory surgery.

== The accident ==
In 1960, when Patient N.A. was 22 years old, a fencing foil went up his nose and injured his brain. This resulted in severe anterograde amnesia, specifically in his verbal memory, as well as impaired eye movements. His nonverbal memory was less affected, as were most of his mental abilities, indicating no retrograde amnesia.

Twenty-six years later, researchers used magnetic resonance imaging (MRI) to identify the brain regions that were damaged. A neurologist named Larry Squire studied his injuries to develop theories that explained the link between brain function and memory.

== Neuropathology ==
Patient N.A. underwent multiple neuroimaging scans through Computed Tomography (CT) and Magnetic Resonance Imaging. His first CT scan was conducted in 1977, followed by another examination in 1983. In both examinations, N.A.'s brain abnormalities revealed a hypodense region in his left thalamus. In the 1983 examinations, an enlarged temporal horn on his lateral ventricle was discovered. Four MRI scans were conducted on Patient N.A. from 1986 to 1987. Diencephalic abnormalities were found as a result of damage to the left thalamus, extending into his brain nuclei. His posterior hypothalamus was also disrupted and mammillaries were missing in both brain hemispheres.

== Neurologists' interpretations of N.A.'s symptoms ==
At first after analyzing the patient's CT scans, it was assumed that his mediodorsal nucleus was affected by a left thalamic lesion. After further scans with magnetic resonance imaging it was revealed that his lesion was more extensive than previously thought. According to his scans, his memory impairment was mostly related to verbal material rather than nonverbal.

The damage in the mammillary nuclei was not related to the type of memory impairment from which patient N.A suffered but rather it was influencing it in combination with the damage that occurred in the thalamic structures.

== Contribution to science ==
Patient N.A.'s case has provided valuable insight into the organization of memory systems in the brain and the role of the hippocampus in episodic memory formation. It has also contributed significantly towards understanding the brain’s memory processes and the distinction between different memory systems.

The study of Patient N.A. has also significantly contributed to research on anterograde amnesia. It gave insight on the underlying structures and processes of anterograde amnesia, and helped to determine the causes of the disease, as well as proving that amnesia can be caused by damaging multiple diencephalic structures.
