= Hugh Aldersey-Williams =

British author and journalist

- Born: 1959 (age 66–67)
- Education: Highgate School; University of Cambridge
- Occupations: Author, journalist, columnist
- Website: www.hughalderseywilliams.com

Hugh Aldersey-Williams (born 1959) is a British author and journalist. Aldersey-Williams was educated at Highgate School and studied the natural sciences at the University of Cambridge. His several books discuss issues surrounding natural and man-made designs. He has curated exhibitions at the Victoria and Albert Museum as well as the Wellcome Collection.

Aldersey-Williams is perhaps best known for his 2011 book Periodic Tales, which The Daily Telegraph described as "a paean to the building blocks of matter". The book takes a comprehensive look through world history to detail where, how, and why humanity discovered the elements. It also received praise from Kirkus Reviews, which labelled it "lucid" and "enjoyable". In October 2015 he co-curated an exhibition based on the book at Compton Verney Art Gallery, Periodic Tales: The Art of the Elements, exhibiting predominantly contemporary art works and focusing on the relationship between artistic objects and the elemental materials that go into their making.

Aldersey-Williams contributed an essay on Sir Thomas Browne to The Society for Curious Thought.

== Background ==
Aldersey-Williams has collected samples of the elements since he was a teenager.

== Books ==
- Aldersey-Williams, Hugh (1995). The most beautiful molecule: the discovery of the buckyball. New York: Wiley. ISBN 978-0-471-10938-9. OCLC 32349204.
- Aldersey-Williams, Hugh (2003). Zoomorphic: new animal architecture. London: Laurence King. ISBN 978-1-85669-340-0. OCLC 53068933.
- Aldersey-Williams, Hugh (2012). Periodic tales: a cultural history of the elements, from arsenic to zinc. New York: Ecco. ISBN 978-0-06-182473-9. OCLC 754770739.
- Aldersey-Williams, Hugh (2013). Anatomies: a cultural history of the human body. New York: Norton. ISBN 978-0-393-23988-1. OCLC 827852486.
- Aldersey-Williams, Hugh (2015). In search of Sir Thomas Browne: the life and afterlife of the seventeenth century's most inquiring mind. New York: W.W. Norton & Company. ISBN 978-0-393-24164-8. OCLC 891611145.
- Aldersey-Williams, Hugh (2016). Tide: the science and lore of the greatest force on earth. London: Viking. ISBN 978-0-241-00336-7. OCLC 951212534.
- Aldersey-Williams, Hugh (2020). Dutch light: Christiaan Huygens and the making of science in Europe. London: Picador. ISBN 978-1-5098-9333-1. OCLC 1144105192.

== See also ==
- List of University of Cambridge members
- List of English writers
