= Periodic Tales =

Popular science book by Hugh Aldersey-Williams

Periodic Tales: The Curious Lives of the Elements
- First edition (UK)
- Author: Hugh Aldersey-Williams
- Subject: Chemical elements History of chemistry
- Publisher: Viking Press (UK); Ecco Press (US)
- Publication date: 2011
- Publication place: US
- Pages: 428
- ISBN: 9780061824722
- OCLC: 639164366

Periodic Tales: The Curious Lives of the Elements (also published as Periodic Tales: A Cultural History of the Elements, from Arsenic to Zinc) is a 2011 popular science and history book by English writer Hugh Aldersey-Williams, on the history and cultural associations of the chemical elements. The book is divided into five sections, "Power", "Fire", "Craft", "Beauty", and "Earth", which group elements according to their primary cultural connotations, rather than their position on the periodic table. For certain elements such as phosphorus, the author documents his attempts to obtain samples by reproducing the original method of discovery. He also visits the site of discovery of several elements uncovered in modern times, including the famed Ytterby mine in Sweden, from which seven new elements were isolated.

== Reception ==
The book received mixed but generally positive reviews from The Daily Telegraph, Kirkus Reviews, Publishers Weekly, and Science News. The Telegraph described the book as "a 400-page love letter to the chemical elements", and "an agreeable jumble of anecdote, reflection and information, rather than a source of understanding". Robert Buntrock, reviewing the book for the Journal of Chemical Education, found it to be more accurate and more enjoyable than The Disappearing Spoon by Sam Kean, a book with similar subject matter and audience published the year before.
