= The Tale of the Dueling Neurosurgeons =

2014 book by Sam Kean

- First edition
- Author: Sam Kean
- Language: English
- Subject: Non-fiction, Biology, Neuroscience, Medicine, History
- Published: May 6, 2014
- Publisher: Little, Brown
- Publication place: United States of America
- Media type: Print (Hardcover and Paperback)
- Pages: 407
- ISBN: 978-0-316-18234-8

The Tale of the Dueling Neurosurgeons, also known by its full title The Tale of the Dueling Neurosurgeons: The History of The Human Brain as Revealed by True Stories of Trauma, Madness, and Recovery is a science book regarding the brain and its functions by Sam Kean. The Daily Telegraph described it as "A dramatic account of the gruesome accidents that shaped modern neuroscience."

== Publication ==
The book was published in hardback on May 6, 2014 by Little, Brown and Company.

== Contents/Synopsis ==
In The Tale of the Dueling Neurosurgeons, Sam Kean travels through time with stories of startling peculiarity and incredible fascination, stories of neurological curiosities: phantom limbs, cannibalism, Siamese brains and a plethora of other strange, though equally fascinating things. Kean effortlessly ties historical accounts, stories of madness and insanity, with the scientific breakthroughs that often followed. His writing shows that every breakthrough was borne of malady, injury, necessity.

=== Part I: Gross Anatomy ===
==== Introduction ====
Each chapter begins with a rebus, a word puzzle, pertaining to the subject of the chapter. In this introductory section, Kean essentially provides some background information and summarizes how the book will continue.

==== Chapter 1: The Dueling Neurosurgeons ====
The first chapter begins with Kean setting the stage of a historic jousting match between King Henri II of France and Gabriel Montgomery. After jousting with Montgomery once, Henri demanded that he go a second time (which broke the laws of chivalry and good sport). It is during this second joust that Henri was whacked square in the face by his opponent's jousting pole.

This is when Kean introduces the "dueling neurosurgeons": Ambroise Paré and Andreas Vesalius, both esteemed neurosurgeons at the time. Paré was the royal surgeon at the time and was a pioneer in terms of medicine, as he refused to heed medical norms at the time due to the fact that they were often painful and useless for the patient. Vesalius was a royal surgeon in a different court, best known for writing and illustrating the book De Humani Corporis Fabrica Libri Septem, which represented a significant advancement in anatomical knowledge and artwork using contemporary renaissance techniques.

They both teamed together when the king fell to try to see if they could revive him. Upon examination, the king had no fractures to his head and so it would have been assumed that nothing was wrong. The surgeons knew better, and were going to encounter the first concussion of that time. After the king's death, they found that his brain was in awful shape, "yellowed and putrefied" and found "pools of blackened fluid beneath the meninges". This is the medical discovery/advancement that would set the stage for generations to come: the fact that brain damage could be present despite no obvious fractures or surface wounds.

=== Part II: Cells, Senses, Circuits ===
==== Chapter 2: The Assassin's Soup ====
This chapter begins with a troubled man: Charles Guiteau. He had apparently heard God speak to him, saying that he should assassinate the president at the time: James Garfield. The man, arguably insane before his attempt to kill the president, had endured a lot in his life such as divorce and being relentlessly made fun of by many groups of people for his unsightly appearance. After much planning, he shot Garfield in the lower back, not killing him right away, but being the ultimate cause of his death (Guiteau claimed that doctors killed Garfield, he had just shot him).

Guiteau's lawyer (who was, subsequently, his brother) George Scoville, pled insanity. Though, after many tests with various court-appointed psychologists/psychiatrists, he was declared sane because he could differentiate between right and wrong.

During the trial, a neurosurgeon Edward Charles Spitzka pointed out that there was more than likely underlying trouble in Guiteau's mind. After the trial concluded and Guiteau passed, an autopsy of his brain was conducted. By this time, autopsy had evolved into a microscopic art, and so Spitzka took to the microscope with samples of Guiteau's brain. Of course, Spitzka found holes in his gray matter and extensive damage to the tissue that "nourished neurons". Later, it was declared that Guiteau was more than likely a schizophrenic.

During this time, another scientist, Camillo Golgi, was brewing up reticulum theory. He had spilled silver solution on brain samples and then looked at them under a microscope. What he saw stunned him: neurons. He noticed they had three parts: the cell body, axon, and dendrites, and he was the first to see them in such detail. He could determine no space between the neurons and emerged a supporter of reticulum theory.

Another scientist, Santiago Ramón y Cajal, was enamored by the pictures of neurons that Golgi produced. Despite his fascination with the drawings, though, he disagreed with reticulum theory. He noticed that, under a microscope, gray matter neurons were not fused together.

The story of another assassin follows: Leon Czolgosz. The man had a similar past to that of Guiteau, and planned to murder president William McKinley as to secure his own party's political candidate in the White House. He proceeded to shoot McKinley in the stomach and pancreas and was then sentenced to the electric chair. McKinley died of infection after eating when his stomach had not fully healed. Much to the anger of various neuroscientists and neurosurgeons alike, Czolgosz's brain was confiscated from study and destroyed.

The experiments of Otto Loewi are also mentioned. His experiment was one in which he placed two frog hearts in separate cups of saline. He sped one heart up by triggering nerves, then transferred the saline of the fast heart into the saline of the normal beating heart, resulting in the normal heart being as fast as the other heart that he had triggered. This proved that neurons did not just use electricity, but also used chemicals. But since he realized that electricity could not jump the (tiny) distance between dendrites, he concluded that the electricity transformed into transferable chemicals.

==== Chapter 3: Wiring and Rewiring ====
Here, Kean introduces the eccentric James Holman. He was a blind explorer, a man who climbed mountains and visited all corners of the globe without sight. He was appointed the Naval Knight of Windsor, which was more illustrious than it sounded. Holman hated being home and often sank into deep bouts of depression when cooped up for too long a time.

To get around during his journeys, he carried a cane. He did not use the cane like other blind people did, feeling around with it. He used his cane to strike the ground, causing a click that he could hear. This click, in turn, echoed in his ears, creating what was essentially human echolocation.

Kean ties in Holman's use of his cane, to teach his brain to "see", with gray matter and white matter. He also talks extensively about circuits. Circuits essentially make up the brain, every human function being controlled by one. The circuits for breathing and yawning do not have much variation and are extremely simple. In contrast to that, the circuit that connects pictures to words, sounds to pictures (i.e. small children learning to read and associating the word dog with the actual animal) are more complicated. Negative experiences also wire circuits. A bad fright in a dark alley may cause you to flinch next time you enter one.

Another thing that concerns wiring and rewiring is the neurological phenomenon of synesthesia. There are over 60 known types of synesthesia. An example would be a synesthesiat hearing a sound and colors flooding their vision or someone reading a passage of words and each letter evokes a different color or a different smell or a different taste. Certain sounds cause the person to feel certain things in turn, or see spots of color dance across their vision. Neurologists agree that this occurs of faulty wiring in the brain, that "neuron circuits that process a sense accidentally strum circuits of another sense, causing both to go off simultaneously". It is debated how this happens. As a child, one possesses more neurons than necessary and the unnecessary ones are pruned away and die when not used. Some believe that synesthesia is a result of poor pruning.

Albert Hoffman helped scientists further understand synesthesia by creating a certain psychedelic drug known as LSD. Created in his lab, he tried it, and was startled by the results. It ultimately showed that we all carry the latent ability of synesthesia if we knew how to tap it as LSD does.

Cajal (from the previous chapter) pointed out that adult neurons and neuron circuits could not renew themselves, and once they were dead, they were dead for good. He said that only children could renew their brain tissue. This is true to some extent, though for adults, while they cannot regrow neurons, they can rewire circuits in their brains with hard work.

==== Chapter 4: Facing Brain Damage ====
This chapter starts with the introduction of mutilés, French soldiers whose faces had been disfigured in World War I. This was the cause of much sadness and insecurity for these men, and many committed suicide. Anna Coleman Ladd, an American sculptor, traveled to France and created facial masks of painted tin for such men, which helped them assimilate back into society to an extent.

Related, a Japanese scientist Tatsuji Inouye examines soldiers who had been shot through their visual cortex during battle and lost random spots of vision. Inouye figured that the spots of missing vision were connected with the spots that their brain had been shot through, and set out to map the visual cortex through talking to these soldiers.

Kean introduces other scientists such as the duo Hubel and Wiesel, who tried various experiments with cats to get their neurons to fire. Through many botched experiment attempts, one fateful accident led to the breakthrough that certain neurons fire at certain things. Specifically, they discovered that neurons like to track motion and can derive the shapes of objects through columns of orientation-preferring neurons.

Kean also, in depth, explains the role of the parietal lobe and the occipital lobe through all these accounts. He writes that the brain can stumble after injury, and the results can be serious. For example, if the visual cortex suffers damage, the person afflicted will lose many things, one of which being basic perceptual skills. Damage to the parietal lobe causes the loss of the ability to locate objects in space. Infections and viruses like herpes may make their way up to the brain and affect it.

He also covers the interesting topic of object-blindness. Someone may not recognize an object, a color, or other seemingly mundane things. Face-blind people cannot recognize faces, and can hardly discern age or gender between portrait pictures.

=== Part III: Body and Brain ===
==== Chapter 5: The Brain's Motor ====
Kean begins the chapter with the sad (fictional) tale of George Dedlow, protagonist of a short story by Silas Weir Mitchell. George Dedlow had fought in the Civil War and in turn had both his arms and both his legs amputated for various reasons. These amputations brought on another neurological phenomenon: phantom limbs. George Dedlow, amongst millions of other war amputees, felt pain in limbs that he did not have.

A neuroscientist, Mitchell specialized in examining amputees and was fascinated with them. He examined patients who complained of pain or discomfort in their phantom arms, legs, and genitals. Here, Kean ties the motor and sensory cortexes in. When something is amputated, the respective part of the brain for controlling that part goes black (figuratively). The now obsolete part of the brain is quickly taken over by neighboring brain areas, such as the face or arms.

V. S. Ramachandran, a neuroscientist, was also fascinated with amputees and their phantom pains. One of his patients was a man with insistent pain in his arm, an arm that was in fact removed many years prior. Ramachandran proceeded to test out a treatment of his own creation. He made the man place his arms into a box, the one arm that was still attached surrounded by mirrors. The box and the mirror together provided the illusion that his arm was still intact. Then, he made the man move his hands around as if he still had both. It is after this ritual of moving his hands about that the man exclaims that he feels his pain subsiding, that he feels his phantom fist unclench for the first time in many years. Thus concludes the chapter about the brain and its motor, which essentially is responsible for every part working correctly.

==== Chapter 6: The Laughing Disease ====
The Laughing Disease, later referred to as kuru, originated in Papua, New Guinea in the tribe of the Fore (For-ay) people. It was commonplace in the tribe to consume the body when someone had passed, more specifically a contaminated human brain. Believing that consuming the body would speed its journey to the afterlife. Cannibalism was an important cultural norm to the Fore, though it was what ultimately spread kuru. The slow rise of this disease caught the attention of one D. Carleton Gajdusek, a doctor who specialized in pediatrics with a strange affinity for microbes and their spread. His interest piqued (he loved to travel around the world in search of malady), he traveled to New Guinea to see what the fuss was about and try to investigate it for himself. While he was there, he collected hundreds of gallons of samples of blood and urine and sweat, trying to find how it spread (and it spread. Rapidly, in fact. It was the question of many biologists and those in the medical field alike). He bribed families for the brains of their deceased, the ones that fell victim to kuru and were going to be eaten by their relatives and used the brains he acquired to conduct autopsies as fast as possible (which were often difficult as refrigeration was often below-average and unavailable).

It is here that Kean brings up the cerebellum, the center in the brain that controls finer movements, controls the timing of movement. Very important. It was probable that a malfunction in this area of the brain was what was the root of kuru, as the symptoms (shuffling, uncontrollable laughing) were typical of that area of the brain.

During an autopsy of a diseased brain, Gajdusek found plaque (microscopic) on many areas. He also discovered many other things that may have come from eating brains. After a long investigation of kuru, and as hundreds of people were dying from it, the phrase "slow virus" was brought about. Along with that, a mix between the words protein and infection was also created: prions. Scientists found that this was how kuru was spread.

The brain has something called the blood-brain barrier which essentially blocks everything from entering the brain, save for a few thing. For instance, if you were to inject dye into the bloodstream, every organ would turn that color except for the brain due to the BBB. It is this barrier that makes it so difficult to medicate people for mental diseases such as Alzheimers and Parkinson's. It was hard for certain things to get it, and even harder for microbes (with the exception of syphilis and herpes). Though, proteins were one of the things that could pass through the barrier. And prions, being part protein, can thus make it through the barrier. Another illness that falls into the category of prions is Creutzfeldt-Jakob syndrome, a degenerative neurological disorder.

Unrelated, after Gajdusek returned after his kuru investigations, he was revealed to be a pedophile after admitting to touching young boys that he had picked up as his children in Papua, New Guinea.

==== Chapter 7: Sex and Punishment ====
Harvey Cushing was fascinated with the idea of mishaps in the pituitary gland. He often sought out circuses and freak shows in hopes that they would have a giant or a dwarf, and often stopped to talk with them about their lives and their pasts. One such giant was a farmer from South Dakota, whose organs Cushing obtained before his funeral service.

The modern study of emotion came about because of James Papez, a neuroanatomist.

It is in his chapter that Kean discusses the limbic system of the brain, the hypothalamus, and the amygdala.

Kean recalls a story in which a woman named S.M. contracted a rare disease that killed off amygdala cells. After it was frozen and shriveled, S.M. felt no fear. She had felt fear in normal amounts at appropriate things as a child, though after the disease had run its course, she felt not a lick of it. It was nearly comical how scientists reacted: they tried (in vain) to scare her. Taking her to haunted houses, she often ran ahead, eager to find out what else awaited.

After this tale, Kean ties it in with the limbic system, the topic of the chapter, and the temporal lobe.

In regards to the temporal lobe, Kean mentions duo Heinrich Klüver and Paul Bucy. The pair experimented on monkeys, removing parts of their brains (the temporal lobes) and getting disastrous and disturbing results.

=== Part IV: Beliefs and Delusions ===
==== Chapter 8: The Sacred Disease ====
The sacred disease is epilepsy, called so because many felt as if their soul met a higher power: God, in some cases. He mentions the plight of Wilder Penfield. His sister had been suffering from major epileptic fits and seizures. He then proceeded to operate on her after noticing a tumor was pressing on her brain from behind her sinuses and dually pressing down on her optic nerve, which was swollen. When he went in to operate, he had to remove 1/8 of her brain, a startling amount. After this mass excavation, he noticed that the tumor grew deep into the other brain hemisphere, and he succumbed to the fact that the tumor had won. She later died because of it, as expected.

Epileptic fits are common amongst famous figures. Dostoyevsky was one epileptic, a temporal lobe epileptic, who fell victim to his illness time and time again, and it affected his writing greatly.

A John Hughlings Jackson noticed that epileptics had uncannily similar seizures, with certain parts seizing after other parts, same sequences. This led him to believe that circuits, though different, had many similarities.

The experiment on Mary Rafferty was a strange one and arguably cruel. She had come in with a two inch gaping hole in her skull brought about by a mix of a chafing whalebone wig and cancer. Roberts Bartholomew took her in and decided to conduct an experiment. He slid two metal electrodes into her brain and started a generator, causing her to move her arms and legs about wildly. He believed he had stuck the electrodes on the motor cortex. She later died.

==== Chapter 9: Sleights of Mind ====
Woodrow Wilson traveled the country with the intention of breaking the Senate. He instead broke himself. After complaining of headaches (among other various ailments) Wilson suffered many small strokes, and then suffered one large one that left him paralyzed and a pity to behold. Another thing: the whole left side of his world ceased to exist.

He suffered from what we now know today as hemispatial neglect, which causes only one hemisphere to process things. Sufferers of this condition will only shave half their faces, eat half their food, dress only half of themselves. In memories of being in a certain place, patients might only recall the buildings on one side of the street. Wilson might have a pile of pens right next to him, but if they were not on the right side, he would complain of not having a pen on hand. He would also deny that he was ill. This is another phenomenon known as anosognosia, which is the refusal to admit that one is ill, refusing to acknowledge the illness.

This leads into the discussion on delusions in general. There are ones such as Cotard's Delusion, in which people believe that they are dead, and Capgras syndrome, in which one believes that everyone has been replaced by a double. There is the Alice in Wonderland syndrome, in which the person's body feels much out of proportion and delusional bicephaly.

=== Part V: Consciousness ===
==== Chapter 10: Honest Lying ====
This chapter covers the mental disorders that afflict those who always lie, compulsively so.

It begins with Kean introducing the fact that the Japanese captured 100,000 men, many of whom were British, as prisoners of war. Some British doctors who had been captured noticed that the Japanese were depriving the men of certain nutrients to see the results. The nutrient in question was thiamine, necessary for proper brain function. Without it, many of the prisoners developed beriberi.

Korsakoff's Syndrome leads to people lying compulsively, especially brain-damaged alcoholics. Back to before, the brain needs thiamine. Alcohol prevents the intestines from absorbing it, leading to thiamine shortage. Because of this shortage, the brain changes majorly.

Another way to lie, other than outright lying, is confabulation. Confabulation is not an outright lie: it happened to the patient at some point, they just cannot recall when. Memories have time stamps, and that time stamp can be corrupted. So a patient might have eaten an exquisite meal twenty years ago on their honeymoon and claimed they ate it yesterday simply because they cannot remember. Confabulation is also a defense mechanism, to protect themselves from embarrassment. When asked how many kids they have, they will often lie because "what kind of monster forgets their children" [sic]? It is, in short, honest lying.

Kean also talks about how hippocampus removal results in amnesia.

While amnesia can be induced very easily, there is the other side of the spectrum: remembering everything. Take Solomon Shereshevsky, who was sent to neurologist Aleksandr Luria by someone at a meeting after noticing Shereshevsky was not taking notes but could repeat everything he had said from that morning verbatim. He could remember things for years.

A normal brain is a good balance, like a sieve.

==== Chapter 11: Left, Right, and Center ====
This chapter focuses on the corpus callosum.

The first story is one in which a man shoots himself in the head, but misses his brain completely, blowing part of his skull off and exposing his brain. He went to the doctor, who in turn pressed the man's brain with a spatula to get a reaction out of him, which he did.

Paul Broca (language) is also discussed, a linguist and a neuroscientist. His relationship (business strictly) with one Gustave Dax is also discussed.

A man named W.J. had what were called "absences" in which he would do something and not realize he had done it and would have 20+ seizures a day. A group of scientists concluded that the corpus callosum spread seizures.

Kean also discusses the differences and similarities and roles of the left and right brain, and the left and right hemispheres.

==== Chapter 12: The Man, the Myth, the Legend ====
Phineas Gage got an iron rod shot up through his skull, injuring his brain and his skull and blinding him in his left eye. His surgeon performed medical surgery on him that relieved the pressure in his skull which ultimately saved his life (King Henri II, if he had received a similar procedure, may have survived). After his surgery, Gage, usually mild, became foul-mouthed and developed ADD-like symptoms, switching from one thing to another very rapidly.

Kean talks about the thalamus and the prefrontal parietal network, the last chapter of this book, the last part of the brain, though not the only one.
