= Anterograde amnesia =

Loss of short-term memory

- Specialty: Neurology

In neurology, anterograde amnesia is the inability to create new memories after an event that caused amnesia, leading to a partial or complete inability to recall the recent past, while long-term memories from before the event remain intact. This is in contrast to retrograde amnesia, where memories created prior to the event are lost while new memories can still be created. Both can occur together in the same patient. To a large degree, anterograde amnesia remains a mysterious ailment because the precise mechanism of storing memories is not yet well understood, although it is known that the regions of the brain involved are certain sites in the temporal cortex, especially in the hippocampus and nearby subcortical regions.

== Signs and symptoms ==
People with anterograde amnesic syndromes may present widely varying degrees of forgetfulness. Some with severe cases have a combined form of anterograde and retrograde amnesia, sometimes called global amnesia.

In the case of drug-induced amnesia, it may be short-lived and patients can recover from it. In another case, which has been studied extensively since the early 1970s, patients often have permanent damage, although some recovery is possible, depending on the nature of the pathophysiology. Usually, some capacity for learning remains, although it may be very elementary. In cases of pure anterograde amnesia, patients have recollections of events prior to the injury, but cannot recall day-to-day information or new facts presented to them after the injury occurred.

In most cases of anterograde amnesia, patients lose explicit memory, or the recollection of facts, while retaining procedural memory. For instance, one may preserve the skill required to complete some tasks, e.g., using a telephone or riding a bike, but they may not remember what they had eaten earlier that day for lunch. One extensively studied anterograde amnesiac patient, codenamed H.M., demonstrated that despite his amnesia preventing him from learning new declarative information, procedural memory consolidation was still possible, albeit at a severely reduced pace. He, along with other patients with anterograde amnesia, were given the same maze to complete day after day.

Despite having no memory of having completed the maze the day before, unconscious practice of completing the same maze over and over reduced the amount of time needed to complete it in subsequent trials. From these results, Corkin et al. concluded despite having no declarative memory (i.e. no conscious memory of completing the maze exists), the patients still had a working procedural memory (learning done unconsciously through practice). This supports the notion that declarative and procedural memory are consolidated in different areas of the brain. Patients have a diminished ability to remember the temporal context in which objects were presented. Certain authors claim the deficit in temporal context memory is more significant than the deficit in the semantic learning ability (described below).

== Causes ==
This disorder is usually acquired in one of four ways. One cause is the use of benzodiazepine drugs such as midazolam, flunitrazepam, lorazepam, temazepam, nitrazepam, triazolam, clonazepam, alprazolam, diazepam, and nimetazepam. All of these are known to have powerful amnesic effects. This has also been recorded in non-benzodiazepine sedatives or "z-drugs" which act on the same set of receptors, such as zolpidem (also known as Ambien), eszopiclone (also known as Lunesta), and zopiclone (also known by brand names Imovane and Zimovane). A second cause is a traumatic brain injury in which damage is usually done to the hippocampus or surrounding cortices. It may also be caused by PTSD, a shocking event, or an emotional disorder.

Illness, though much rarer, can also cause anterograde amnesia if it causes encephalitis, which is the inflammation of brain tissue. There are several types of encephalitis: one such is herpes simplex encephalitis (HSV), which, if left untreated, can lead to neurological deterioration. How HSV gains access to the brain is unknown. The virus shows a distinct predilection for certain parts of the brain. Initially, it is present in the limbic cortices. It may then spread to the adjacent frontal and temporal lobes. Damage to specific areas can result in reduced or eliminated ability to encode new explicit memories, giving rise to anterograde amnesia.

Patients with anterograde amnesia may have episodic, semantic, or both types of explicit memory impaired for events after the trauma that caused the amnesia. This suggests that memory consolidation for different types of memory takes place in different regions of the brain. Despite this, current knowledge on human memory is still insufficient to "map out" the wiring of a human brain to discover which parts of which lobe are responsible for the various episodic and semantic knowledge within a person's memory.

Amnesia is seen in patients who, for the reason of preventing another more serious disorder, have parts of their brains known to be involved in memory circuits removed, the most notable of which is known as the medial temporal lobe (MTL) memory system, described below. Patients with seizures originating in the MTL may have either side or both structures removed (there is one structure per hemisphere). Patients with tumors who undergo surgery will often sustain damage to these structures, as is described in a case below. Damage to any part of this system, including the hippocampus and surrounding cortices, results in amnesic syndromes. This is why after a stroke people have a chance of developing cognitive deficits that result in anterograde amnesia, since strokes can involve the temporal lobe in the temporal cortex, and the temporal cortex houses the hippocampus.

Anterograde amnesia can be the first clinical sign that Alzheimer's disease is developing within the brain. Although later the complications can be much more widespread and strongly impair cognitive processes, at the initial stage of Alzheimer's the changes observed can be restricted to anterograde amnesia and a mild deficit in retaining newly learnt sequences. This is explained by the fact that the disease is initiated within the medial temporal lobe and first affects the entorhinal cortex that directly sends and receives information from the hippocampal formation.

=== Alcohol intoxication ===
Anterograde amnesia can also be caused by alcohol intoxication, a phenomenon commonly known as a blackout. Studies show rapid rises in blood alcohol concentration over a short period of time severely impair or in some cases completely block the brain's ability to transfer short-term memories created during the period of intoxication to long-term memory for storage and later retrieval. Such rapid rises are caused by drinking large amounts of alcohol in short periods of time, especially on an empty stomach, as the dilution of alcohol by food slows the absorption of alcohol. Alcohol-related anterograde amnesia is directly related to the rate of consumption of alcohol, and is often associated with binge drinking, and not just the total amount of alcohol consumed in a drinking episode.

Test subjects have been found not to experience amnesia when drinking slowly, despite being heavily intoxicated by the end of the experiment. When alcohol is consumed at a rapid rate, the point at which most healthy people's long-term memory creation starts to fail usually occurs at approximately 0.20% BAC, but can be reached as low as 0.14% BAC for infrequent drinkers. The exact duration of these blackout periods is hard to determine, because most people fall asleep before they black out. Upon reaching sobriety, usually after waking, long-term memory creation is completely restored.

Severe alcohol use disorder is associated with thiamine (vitamin B_{1}) deficiency in the brain, which can cause Korsakoff syndrome and is often preceded by Wernicke encephalopathy.

The memory impairment that is pathognomonic to Korsakoff's syndrome predominantly affects the declarative memory, leaving non-declarative memory that is often procedural in nature relatively intact. The disproportionate severity in anterograde episodic memory processes in contrast to other cognitive processes is what differentiates Korsakoff syndrome from other conditions such as alcohol-related dementia. Evidence for the preservation of certain memory processes in the presence of severe anterograde episodic memory serve as an experimental paradigm to investigate the components of human memory.

== Pathophysiology ==
The pathophysiology of anterograde amnesic syndromes varies with the extent of damage and the regions of the brain that were damaged. The most well-described regions indicated in this disorder are the medial temporal lobe (MTL), basal forebrain, and fornix. Beyond the details described below, the precise process of how we remember – on a micro scale – remains a mystery. Neuropsychologists and scientists are still not in total agreement over whether forgetting is due to faulty encoding, accelerated forgetting, or faulty retrieval, although a great deal of data seem to point to the encoding hypothesis.

Neuroscientists are in disagreement about the length of time involved in memory consolidation. Though most researchers, including Hasselmo et al., have found the consolidation process is spread out over several hours before transitioning from a fragile to a more permanent state, others, including Brown et al., posits that memory consolidation can take months or even years in a drawn-out process of consolidation and reinforcement. Further research into the length of time of memory consolidation will shed more light on why anterograde amnesia sometimes affects some memories gained after the event(s) that caused the amnesia, but does not affect other such memories.

=== Medial temporal lobe ===
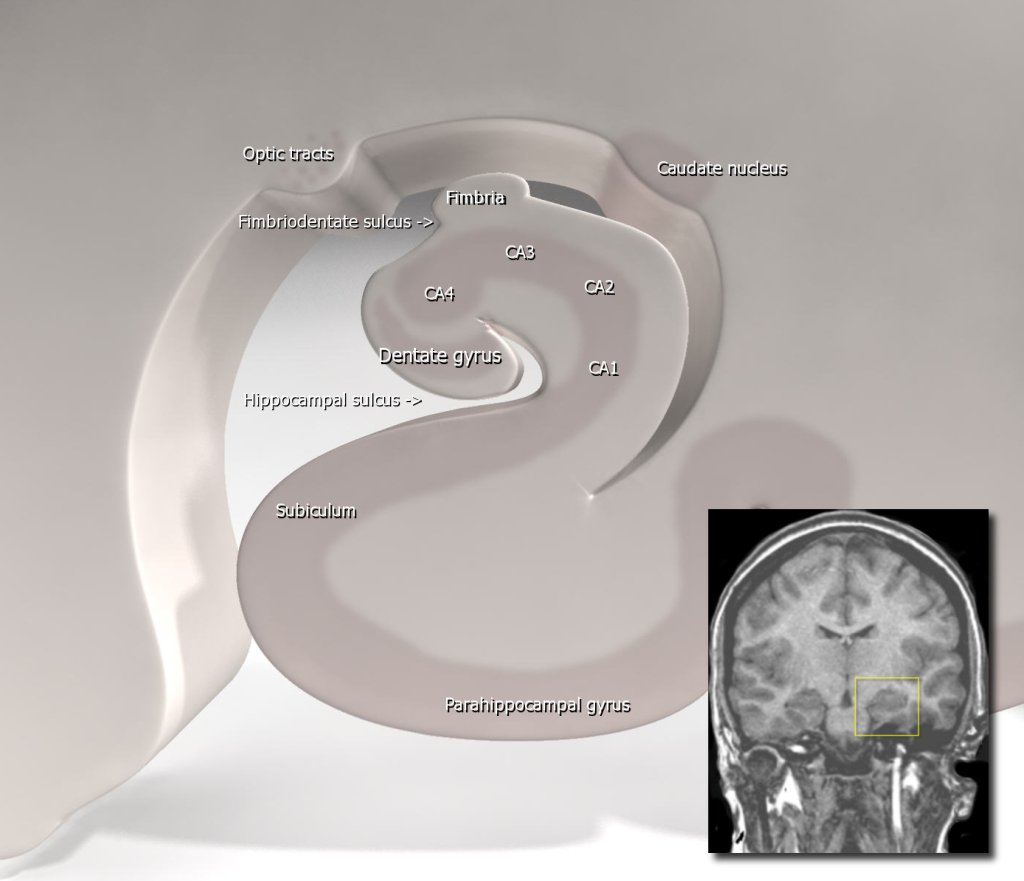
The hippocampus in the brain

The MTL memory system includes the hippocampal formation (CA fields, dentate gyrus, subicular complex), perirhinal, entorhinal, and parahippocampal cortices. It is known to be important for the storage and processing of declarative memory, which allows for factual recall. It is also known to communicate with the neocortex in the establishment and maintenance of long-term memories, although its known functions are independent of long-term memory. Nondeclarative memory, on the other hand, which allows for the performance of different skills and habits, is not part of the MTL memory system. Most data point to a "division of labor" among the parts of this system, although this is still being debated and is described in detail below.

In animal models, researchers have shown monkeys with damage to both the hippocampus and its adjacent cortical regions were more severely impaired in terms of anterograde amnesia than monkeys with damage localized to hippocampal structures. However, conflicting data in another primate study points to the observation that the amount of tissue damaged does not necessarily correlate with the severity of the memory loss. The data does not explain the dichotomy that exists in the MTL memory system between episodic memory and semantic memory (described below).

An important finding in amnesic patients with MTL damage is the impairment of memory in all sensory modalities – sound, touch, smell, taste, and sight. This reflects the fact that the MTL is a processor for all of the sensory modalities, and helps store these kind of thoughts into memory. In addition, subjects can often remember how to perform relatively simple tasks immediately, in the order of 10 seconds. When the task becomes more difficult, even on the same time scale, subjects tend to forget. This demonstrates the difficulty of separating procedural memory tasks from declarative memory; some elements of declarative memory may be used in learning procedural tasks.

MTL amnesic patients with localized damage to the hippocampus retain other perceptual abilities, such as the ability to intelligently function in society, to make conversation, to make one's bed, etc. Anterograde amnesics without combined retrograde disorders (localized damage to the MTL system) have memories prior to the traumatic event. For this reason, the MTL is not the storage place of all memories; other regions in the brain also store memories. The key is the MTL is responsible for the learning of new materials.

=== Other memory systems ===
A limited number of cases have been described in which patients with damage to other parts of the brain acquired anterograde amnesia. Easton and Parker observed damage to either the hippocampus or the surrounding cortices does not seem to result in severe amnesia in primate models. They suggested damage to the hippocampus and surrounding structures alone does not explain the amnesia they saw in patients, or increasing damage does not correlate with the degree of impairment.

The data does not explain the dichotomy that exists in the MTL memory system between episodic and semantic memory. To demonstrate their hypothesis, they used a primate model with damage to the basal forebrain. They proposed that the disruption of neurons that project from the basal forebrain to the MTL are responsible for some of the impairment in anterograde amnesia. Easton and Parker also reported MRI scans of patients with severe anterograde amnesia showed damage beyond to cortical areas around the hippocampus and amygdala (a region of brain involved in emotions) and to surrounding white matter. White matter in the brain consists of axons, long projections of neuronal cell bodies.

Another case described the onset of anterograde amnesia as a result of cell death in the fornix, another structure that carries information from the hippocampus to the structures of the limbic system and the diencephalon. The patient in this case did not show any disconnection syndrome, which is unexpected since the structures involved divide the brain hemispheres. Both sides of her brain were able to communicate. Instead, she showed signs of amnesia. The final diagnosis was made by MRI. This particular amnesic syndrome is difficult to diagnose and is often misdiagnosed by physicians as an acute psychiatric disorder.

== Reorganization of memory ==
When there is damage to just one side of the MTL, there is opportunity for normal functioning or near-normal function for memories. Neuroplasticity describes the ability of the cortex to remap when necessary. Remapping can occur in cases like the one above and with time the patient can recover and become more skilled at memory retention. A case report describing a patient who had two lobectomies – in the first, doctors removed part of her right MTL first because of seizures originating from the region, and later her left because she developed a tumor – demonstrates this.

This case is unique because it is the only one in which both sides of the MTL were removed at different times. The authors observed that the patient was able to recover some ability to learn when she had only one MTL, but observed the deterioration of function when both sides of the MTL were affected. The reorganization of brain function for epileptic patients has had limited investigation, but imaging results show that it may occur.

== Rehabilitation ==
Approaches used to treat those with anterograde amnesia often use interventions which focus on compensatory techniques, such as beepers, written notes, diaries or through intensive training programs involving the active participation of the individual concerned, along with their supporting network of family and friends. In this perspective, environmental adaptation techniques are used, such as the compensatory technique education to training (exercise), organizational strategies, visual imagery and verbal labeling. Other techniques are used in rehabilitation, such as implicit tasks, speech and mnemotechnic methods.

So far, it has been proven that education techniques of compensatory strategies for memory disorders are effective in individuals with minor traumatic brain injuries. In moderately or severely injured individuals, effective interventions are those appealing to external aids, such as reminders in order to facilitate particular knowledge or skill acquisition. In reality, orientation techniques are also considered; their purpose is to enhance orientation using stimulation and repetition of the basic orientation information. These techniques are regularly applied in populations of patients primarily presenting dementia and head injuries.

== Controversies ==
=== Episodic versus semantic memory ===
As described above, patients with anterograde amnesia have a wide range of forgetfulness. Declarative memory can be further subdivided into episodic and semantic memory. Episodic memory is the recollection of autobiographical information with a temporal and/or spatial context, whereas semantic memory involves recall of factual information with no such association (language, history, geography, etc.). In a case study of a girl who developed anterograde amnesia during childhood, it was determined that the patient ("C.L.") retained semantic memory while having an extreme impairment of episodic memory.

One patient, known by the codename "Gene", was involved in a motorcycle accident that damaged significant portions of his frontal and temporal lobes, including his left hippocampus. As a result, he could not remember any specific episode in his life, such as a train derailment near his house. However, his semantic memory was intact; he remembered that he owned a car and two motorcycles, and he could even remember the names of his classmates in a school photograph.

In stark contrast, a woman whose temporal lobes were damaged in the front due to encephalitis lost her semantic memory. She lost her memory of many simple words, historical events, and other trivial information categorized under semantic memory. Her episodic memory was left intact. She could recall episodes such as her wedding and her father's death with great detail.

Vicari et al. describe that it remains unclear whether neural circuits involved in semantic and episodic memory overlap partially or completely, and this case seems to suggest that the two systems are independent. Both of the patient's hippocampal and diencephalic structures on the right and left sides were disconnected. When C.L. came to Vicari et al.'s office, her chief complaint was forgetfulness involving both semantic and episodic memory. After administering a battery of neuropsychological tests, Vicari determined that C.L. performed well in tests of visual naming and sentence comprehension, visual-spatial ability, and "general semantic knowledge about the world". They also noted an improved vocabulary and general knowledge base after 18 months.

C.L.'s episodic memory, on the other hand, was far below expectations: She could not retain daily events, where she had gone on vacation, the names of places she had been, and other such information. However, this study and others like it are susceptible to subjectivity, since it is not always possible to clearly distinguish between episodic and semantic memory. For this reason, the topic remains controversial and debated.

=== Familiarity and the fractionation of memory ===
The right hippocampus is clearly necessary for familiarity in spatial tasks, whereas the left hippocampus is necessary for familiarity-based recollection in verbal tasks. Some researchers claim the hippocampus is important for the retrieval of memories, whereas adjacent cortical regions can support familiarity-based memories. These memory decisions are made based on matching already-existing memories, before the onset of pathology, to the current situation. According to Gilboa et al., patients with localized hippocampal damage can score well on a test if it is based on familiarity.

Poreh et al. describe a case study of patient A.D., whose damage to the fornix rendered the hippocampus useless, but spared adjacent cortical areas – a fairly rare injury. When the patient was given a test with something with which he had some familiarity, the patient was able to score well. In general, A.D. had severely impaired episodic memory, but had some ability to learn semantic knowledge. Other studies show animals with similar injuries can recognize objects with which they are familiar, but, when the objects are presented in an unexpected context, they do not score well on recognition tests.

=== Islands of memory ===
Patients with anterograde amnesia have trouble recalling new information and new autobiographical events, but the data is less consistent in regard to the latter. Medveds and Hirst recorded the presence of islands of memory – detailed accounts – that were described by such patients. The island memories were a combination of semantic and episodic memories. The researchers recorded patients giving long narratives with a fair amount of detail that resembled memories that the patients had prior to the trauma. The appearance of islands of memory could have something to do with the functioning of adjacent cortical areas and the neocortex. In addition, the researchers suspect that the amygdala played a role in the narratives.

== Notable cases ==
The most famous case reported is that of patient Henry Molaison, known as H.M., in March 1953. Molaison's chief complaint was the persistence of severe seizures and therefore he was given a bilateral lobectomy, with both his medial temporal lobes removed. As a result, Molaison had bilateral damage to both the hippocampal formation and the perirhinal cortex. Molaison had average intelligence and perceptual ability, and a decent vocabulary. However, he could not learn new words or remember things that had happened more than a few minutes earlier. He could remember anything from his childhood. If the memory was created from before his lobectomy, he still had the ability to retrieve it and remember. However, he was able to learn some new skills. He was the first well-documented case of severe anterograde amnesia, and was studied until his death in 2008.

A similar case involved Clive Wearing, an accomplished musicologist who contracted a cold sore virus that attacked his brain, causing herpes simplex encephalitis. As a result, Wearing developed both anterograde and retrograde amnesia. He has little memory of what happened before the virus struck him in 1985, and cannot learn new declarative knowledge after the virus struck him. As a result of anterograde amnesia, Wearing repeatedly "wakes up" every day, usually in 30-second intervals. He has a history of repeatedly recording these moments of waking up in his journal (e.g., On Sept 2, 2013, I woke up, etc. etc.) and crossing out prior entries, as if the other moments of waking up were not real. His episodic memory is nonfunctional, so he does not consciously recall having woken up 30 seconds prior.

Clive is often elated to see his wife, as if he has not seen her for a while. Despite this, Wearing maintained his ability to play the piano and conduct choirs. This case is significant because it demonstrates declarative and procedural memory are separate. Therefore, despite anterograde amnesia preventing Wearing from learning new bits of information that can be explained in words (declarative memory), and preventing him from storing new memories of events or episodes (also part of declarative memory), he has little trouble in retaining his musical abilities (procedural memory), though he has no conscious memory of having learned music.

Another case in the literature is Eugene Pauly, known as E.P., a severely amnesic patient, owing to viral encephalitis, who was able to learn three-word sentences. He performed better on consecutive tests over a 12-week period, of 24 study sessions. However, when asked how confident he was about the answers, his confidence did not appear to increase. Bayley and Squire proposed his learning was similar to the process required by procedural memory tasks. E.P. could not get the answers right when one word in the three-word sentence was changed, or the order of words was changed. His ability to answer correctly, thus, became more of a "habit". Bayley and Squire claim the learning may have happened in the neocortex, and it happened without the conscious knowledge of E.P. They hypothesized the information may be acquired directly by the neocortex (to which the hippocampus projects) when there is repetition. This case illustrates the difficulty in separating procedural from declarative tasks. This adds another dimension to the complexity of anterograde amnesia.

== In fiction ==
=== Film ===
Notable examples include Lucy Whitmore in 50 First Dates, Joseph Gordon-Levitt in The Lookout, Kaori Fujimiya in One Week Friends, Chihiro Shindou in Ef: A Fairy Tale of the Two, Christine Lucas in Before I Go to Sleep, Gus in Remember Sunday.

Christopher Nolan's psychological crime film Memento (2000) contains a distinguished depiction of anterograde amnesia, in that the memory-impaired protagonist Leonard Shelby is trying to identify and kill the man who raped and murdered his wife, and does so through a system of writing crucial details related to the search on his body and on the blank spaces of Polaroid photographs. Mental health experts have described Memento as one of the most accurate depictions of amnesia in film history, an accuracy that was enhanced by the film's fragmented, non-linear structure that mimics the protagonist's memory problems.

Dory, the happy-go-lucky Regal Blue Tang from Finding Nemo (2003) and Finding Dory (2016), suffers from anterograde amnesia. While Dory forgets conversations within minutes of having them, she never quite forgets who she is, or the fact that she has short-term memory loss, and can therefore explain her bizarre behavior to those around her.

Ghajini (2008), a Hindi language film from India based on Memento, in which the main protagonist Sanjay Singhania played by Amir Khan has short-term memory loss, a variant of amnesia. In the film he is the one behind Ghajini, the killer of his fiancée Kalpana. In the TV series Perception, an episode revolved around a crime victim with this condition. The main character Latro in Gene Wolfe's novels Soldier of the Mist, and the anime characters Vash the Stampede from Trigun and Index and Tōma from A Certain Magical Index had both retrograde and anterograde amnesia. The disorder has also been portrayed in music by English musician the Caretaker in Theoretically Pure Anterograde Amnesia (2005) and Additional Amnesiac Memories (2006).

In the 1964 film 36 Hours, Rod Taylor plays Nazi Major Walter Gerber, a psychiatrist who has developed an effective method for treating German soldiers with what is now known as PTSD – and for painlessly extracting information from Allied prisoners. The technique involves convincing patients that years have passed, the war is over, and that they have anterograde amnesia, which supposedly can be cured with talk therapy. A few days before D-Day, U.S. Army Major Jeff Pike (James Garner) is drugged, kidnapped and taken to what appears to be a hospital run by American Occupation Forces, where his appearance is altered overnight. Pike knows that the invasion is aimed at Normandy, not Pas de Calais, as the Nazi high command expects. He buys Gerber's explanation of anterograde amnesia – using the double doors of a wardrobe as illustration – and speaks casually of Normandy. Salt in a papercut alerts him to the horrible truth, and the drama proceeds from there.

=== Television ===
In the episode "Pimemento" of Brooklyn Nine-Nine, Adrian Pimento develops an artificial form of anterograde amnesia after being drugged by his therapist, which is the main plot point of the episode.

In the Star Trek: Enterprise episode "Twilight", Jonathan Archer develops anterograde amnesia.

In the Castle episode "The Fifth Bullet", Jeremy Preswick experiences anterograde amnesia after being witness to a murder.

In the My Name is Earl episode "Sweet Johnny", Earl Hickey attempts to make up to a stuntman nicknamed Sweet Johnny for sleeping with the latter's girlfriend, but the man has gone under 10 years unable to create new memories after a freak accident that wasn't a stunt but a preparation before a stunt. Johnny thinks every day is the day before one of his big stunts.

=== Books ===
In the 2011 the light novel Danganronpa Zero, the protagonist and "Ultimate Analyst" Ryoko Otonashi has anterograde amnesia as a result of "The Tragedy". She keeps note of her memories by writing into a journal at all times and using her speedreading to keep herself up to date. Seen to be her boyfriend and "Ultimate Neurologist" Yasuke Matsuda, Ryoko witnesses a murder committed by Junko Enoshima, before being mistaken for wanted murderer and Tragedy perpetrator Izuru Kamukura by the "Ultimate Bodyguard" Madarai octuplets. After teaming up with the perverted "Ultimate Secret Agent" Yuto Kamishiro in an attempt to discover the perpetrator behind the Tragedy, Ryoko learns that she herself was personally involved in the event as the true Junko. The Junko she met was her non-identical twin sister Mukuro Ikusaba, with whom she shared Matsuda as a boyfriend, attempting to trigger her memories, which Matsuda had been suppressing on Junko's own request, both to clear her of suspicion in the events of the Tragedy, attempt to cure her depression, and a test to wipe the memories of others. Attempting to subdue Ryoko, Matsuda accidentally restores her memories of being Junko and being fatally stabbed, before wishing Junko success in her planned actions with Izuru and Mukuro: a collapsing world society and launching a "killing game".

In the 2003 novel The Housekeeper and the Professor by Yōko Ogawa, the Professor suffers from anteretograde amnesia following a traffic accident and is unable to store memories for more than eighty minutes.

=== Video games ===
In the 2016 video game Phoenix Wright: Ace Attorney – Spirit of Justice, the character Sorin Sprocket is eventually revealed to have anterograde amnesia, which he developed after unintentionally causing a car accident which killed his sister. This causes his memories to completely reset every time he wakes up from sleeping, to the day after this accident. This depiction is notable for demonstrating the relationship issues that arise between Sorin and his fiancée, Ellen Wyatt, as a result of this disorder, most noticeably with how Sorin's feelings towards her comes across as distant and cold.

As the storyline continues, the player comes to uncover that Sorin in fact deeply loves his fiancée, and is able to maintain this love despite his disorder, but in fact feels a sense of guilt over the fact that he has to constantly remind himself of the fact that this love exists inside of him every day, due to his disorder. It is also noticeable that it depicts how Sorin deals with his disorder, by keeping a journal where he writes down every detail of every day after his sister's death. He carries this journal around everywhere he goes as a substitute to his memories, and uses what is written in the notebook to become aware each time he wakes up of the fact that he has this condition, what the current date apparently is, and everything important that have apparently occurred on every day since he first developed the condition.

The episode also deals with legal issues concerning the disorder, when it is debated during Ellen Wyatt's trial as to whether Sorin's journal can be considered a proper substitution to his memories for the sake of viable witness testimony. Dangers imposed by this also come into play when it is revealed that a page in Sorin's journal had been altered by someone, which causes him to go into a mental collapse, afraid that any of his other memories and thoughts could also have arisen from someone else's manipulation.

== See also ==
- Transient global amnesia
- Patient N.A.

== Other sources ==
- Hasselmo, M.; McClelland, J. (1999). "Neural models of memory". Current Opinion in Neurobiology. 9 (2): 184–88. doi:10.1016/s0959-4388(99)80025-7. PMID 10322183. S2CID 15768044.
- Weingartner, H., Parker, E. Memory Consolidation: Psychobiology of Cognition. Hillsdale: Lawrence Erlbaum Associates, Inc., Publishers, 1984.
- Corkin, S (2002). "What's new with the amnesic patient H.M.?". Nature Reviews Neuroscience. 3 (2): 153–60. doi:10.1038/nrn726. PMID 11836523. S2CID 5429133.
- Engmann, Birk; Reuter, Mike (2003). "A case history of sudden memory dysfunction – caused by transient epileptic amnesia". Aktuelle Neurologie. 30: 350–53.
- Vuilleumier, P.; Despland, P; Regli, F (1996). "Failure to recall (but not to remember): Pure transient amnesia during nonconvulsive status epilepticus". Neurology. 46 (4): 1036–39. doi:10.1212/wnl.46.4.1036. PMID 8780086. S2CID 40835407.
- Hampstead, B. M.; Koffler, S. P. (2009). "Thalamic Contributions To Anterograde, Retrograde, And Implicit Memory: A Case Study". The Clinical Neuropsychologist. 23 (7): 1232–49. doi:10.1080/13854040902936679. PMID 19548181. S2CID 205809362.
