= Sam Kean =

American writer

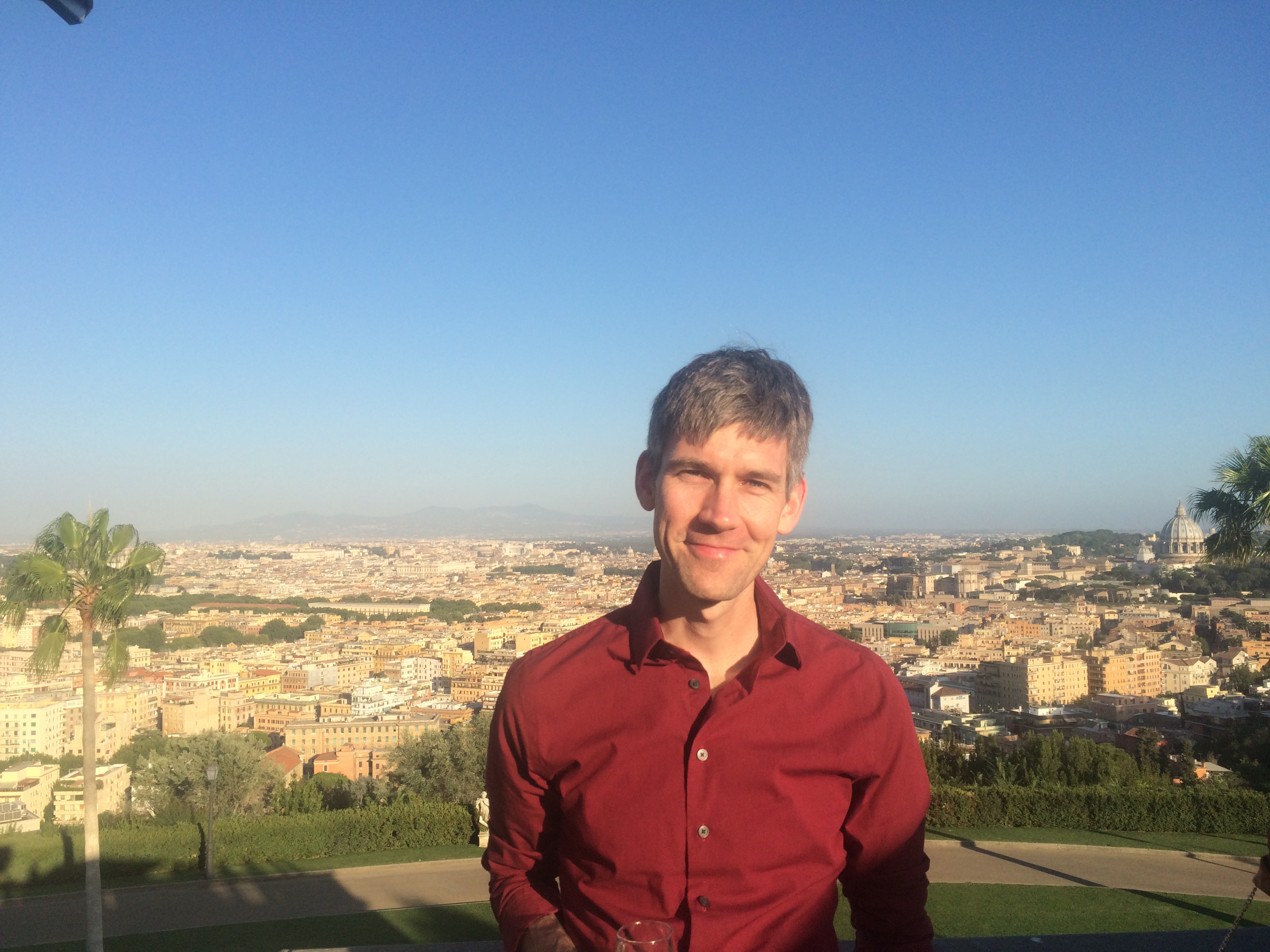
- Born: Sioux Falls, South Dakota
- Education: University of Minnesota, Catholic University of America
- Writing career
- Genre: non-fiction

Sam Kean is an American writer. He has written for The New York Times Magazine, Mental Floss, Slate, Psychology Today, and The New Scientist. He has also published eight books which discuss scientific discoveries in a narrative style. His books received positive reviews in The Wall Street Journal Library Journal, and The New York Times. He was born in Sioux Falls, South Dakota, and lives in Washington, D.C.

== Life and career ==
Sam Kean was born in Sioux Falls, South Dakota. He studied Physics and English Literature at the University of Minnesota and later earned a master's degree in Library Science from Catholic University of America in Washington, D.C.

Kean is the editor for the 18th edition of The Best American Science and Nature Writing and has been featured on National Public Radio shows Radiolab, Science Friday, All Things Considered, and Fresh Air.

== Recognition ==
Sam Kean's work has earned the title of a New York Times bestselling author and various awards and recognition. His four books, The Violinist’s Thumb, The Disappearing Spoon, the Tale of The Dueling Neurosurgeons, and Caesar’s Last Breath were all Amazon's top science book of the year. His book The Disappearing Spoon came second in 2010 for the Royal Society of the London's book of the year. In 2013 and 2015, The Violinist’s Thumb and The Tale of the Dueling Neurosurgeons respectively, were both nominated for the PEN/E.O Wilson award and the AAAS/Subaru prize.

== Books ==
- The Disappearing Spoon: And Other True Tales of Madness, Love, and the History of the World from the Periodic Table of the Elements (2010)
- The Violinist's Thumb: and Other Lost Tales of Love, War, and Genius, as Written by Our Genetic Code (2012)
- The Tale of the Dueling Neurosurgeons: the History of the Human Brain as Revealed by True Stories of Trauma, Madness, and Recovery (2014)
- Caesar's Last Breath: Decoding the Secrets of the Air Around Us (2017)
- The Bastard Brigade: The True Story of the Renegade Scientists and Spies Who Sabotaged the Nazi Atomic Bomb (2019)
- The Icepick Surgeon: Murder, Fraud, Sabotage, Piracy, and Other Dastardly Deeds Perpetrated in the Name of Science (2021)
- Dinner with King Tut: How Rogue Archaeologists Are Re-creating the Sights, Sounds, Smells, and Tastes of Lost Civilizations (2025)
- The Museum of Lost Things: True Tales of Fabled Treasures, Legendary Cities, and Mythical Creatures That Vanished From History (2026)
