= John Albert Gardner =

American murderer, rapist and child molester

John Albert Gardner III
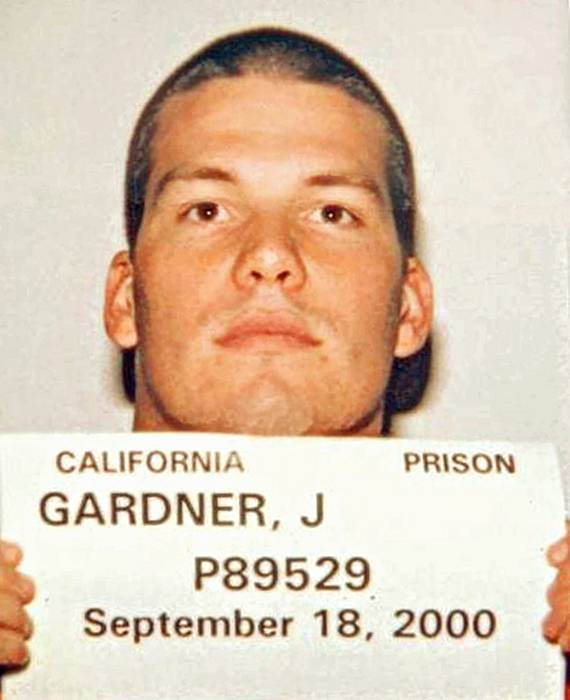
- September 2000 mugshot of Gardner
- Born: April 9, 1979 (age 47); Culver City, California
- Parent(s): Cathy Osborn; John Gardner Sr.
- Status: Incarcerated
- Convictions: First degree murder with special circumstances (2 counts); Assault with intent to commit rape Committing a lewd act on a child under the age of 14 (2 counts)
- Penalty: Life imprisonment without the possibility of parole

Details
- Victims: Amber Dubois, 14; Chelsea King, 17
- Date: February 13, 2009; February 25, 2010
- Country: United States
- State: California

John Albert Gardner III (born April 9, 1979) is an American convicted double murderer, rapist, and child molester. He confessed to the February 2009 rape and murder of 14-year-old Amber Dubois from Escondido, California, and the February 2010 rape and murder of 17-year-old Chelsea King from Poway, California, after he entered a plea agreement that spared him from execution. Additionally, Gardner attempted to rape 22-year-old Candice Moncayo of San Diego County, and had been previously incarcerated for the molestation of a 13-year-old girl.

== Early life ==
John Albert Gardner III was born in Culver City, California on April 9, 1979. His parents divorced and Gardner frequently relocated around Southern California as a child (including Lawndale, California, and Palmdale, California); when he was a teenager, he settled in Running Springs, California. Gardner later said his father was an abusive alcoholic who beat him. His mother, Cathy Osborn, was a psychiatric nurse, and Gardner was put on psychiatric medication starting at age 6. He was held in a psychiatric hospital for 60 days at age 10 (in 1989).

As a student, Gardner was labeled "seriously emotionally disturbed." He graduated from Rim of the World High School in Lake Arrowhead, California, in 1997 with a 3.2 grade point average and IQ of 113. He was also diagnosed with attention deficit hyperactivity disorder.

While in high school, Gardner worked odd jobs including as a lifeguard at a resort in Lake Arrowhead. As a teenager, he was convicted of trespassing at a high school. After graduating from high school, Gardner moved to San Diego and worked at a Big 5 Sporting Goods store.

== Prior conviction ==
Gardner had been convicted in 2000 of molesting a 13-year-old female neighbor. He spent five years in prison and completed his parole in 2008 although it was determined that he had violated the terms of his parole seven times, including living too close to a school in 2007. Gardner was also investigated by his parole officer for possession of marijuana but this incident was dismissed. Gardner was also being tracked by a GPS anklet up until four months before the murder of Amber Dubois. Gardner totaled 168 parole violations while wearing the anklet. According to GPS data, Gardner spent time close to several schools, in front of a daycare center, on prison grounds (where he was suspected of delivering contraband to a prisoner) and in remote locations where the remains of Amber Dubois were later discovered.

== Murders ==
Amber DuBois
- Born: Amber Leeanne DuBois; October 25, 1994; Escondido, California, U.S.
- Died: February 13, 2009 (aged 14); Pala, California, U.S.
- Cause of death: Homicide by stabbing

Chelsea King
- Born: Chelsea Alexandra King; July 1, 1992; Poway, California, U.S.
- Died: February 25, 2010 (aged 17); Rancho Bernardo, California, U.S.
- Cause of death: Homicide by strangulation

Gardner's first known murder victim was 14-year-old Amber Dubois, who disappeared in February 2009. Her skeletal remains were later recovered by police in March 2010, after the police had questioned Gardner about her murder. Gardner had been arrested on February 28, 2010, in the Del Dios district of Escondido, California, when his DNA matched a DNA sample taken from the discarded clothing of Chelsea King, a senior from nearby Poway High School. King had disappeared on February 25, 2010, while she was jogging in the early evening at the Rancho Bernardo Community Park, near Lake Hodges. FBI divers found her body five days later (on March 2, 2010) buried in a shallow grave on the southeast corner of the lake's inlet, where some of her clothes had been found.

DNA evidence from King's clothing, along with a December 2009 attempted attack on a female jogger who managed to fight him off, led Escondido and San Diego police to patrol the area for a man fitting Gardner's description. He was arrested on February 28 at a bar and restaurant in Del Dios on the western shore of Lake Hodges in Escondido. A witness has indicated that Gardner revisited the park subsequent to King's disappearance.

== Guilty pleas ==
On April 16, 2010, Gardner pleaded guilty to the murder and rape of both Dubois (who disappeared on February 13, 2009, and whose skeletal remains were found near the northern border of the Pala California Indian Reservation on March 6, 2010) and King in 2010 after the prosecutors agreed not to seek the death penalty. He admitted to kidnapping, raping, and stabbing Dubois. He also admitted to dragging King to a remote area where he raped and strangled her, and then buried the body. In addition, Gardner also admitted and pleaded guilty to attempting to rape Candice Moncayo in December 2009, who was able to fight back and escape. On May 15, 2010, Gardner was sentenced to life in prison without the possibility of parole. Amber's parents, Chelsea's parents, and surviving victim Candice Moncayo all made impact statements prior to sentencing. In their statements, they described the impact Gardner's crimes had on their lives and their determination to see to it that Chelsea's Law, which was introduced by Assemblymen Nathan Fletcher, was passed. The bill, designed to help prevent similar crimes in the future, was signed into California state law by then-Gov. Arnold Schwarzenegger on September 9, 2010. As signed, Chelsea's Law mandates that some of the worst child molester offenders face lifetime prison sentences - a punishment previously reserved in California for murderers. In addition, some paroled child molesters deemed at risk of re-offending are barred from parks. For Gardner's trial, the Kings retained Michael Fell, a California criminal lawyer and former prosecutor, who specializes in representing victims under Marsy's Law, the state constitutional amendment that guarantees legal rights for victims of crime.

== Sentencing ==
On May 14, 2010, Judge David Danielsen sentenced Gardner to life imprisonment with no possibility of parole, two terms of life imprisonment without parole for the rape and murder of Chelsea King and Amber Dubois, another term of 25 years to life for assault with attempt to commit a rape, and an additional 24 years of imprisonment for prior convictions. Since he entered the plea agreement, Gardner waived his right to appeal.

Gardner is currently incarcerated at Mule Creek State Prison.
