= Prosopometamorphopsia =

Visual disorder

- Pronunciation: /ˌprɒsəpəˌmɛtəmɔːrˈfɒpsiə/ PROSS-ə-pə-MET-ə-mor-FOP-see-ə
- Specialty: Neurology
- Frequency: Fewer than 100 cases

Prosopometamorphopsia (PMO), also known as demon face syndrome, is a neurological disorder characterized by altered perceptions of faces. In the perception of a person with the disorder, facial features are distorted in a variety of ways including drooping, swelling, discoloration, and shifts of position.

Prosopometamorphopsia is distinct from prosopagnosia, which is characterised by the inability to recognise faces.

About 75-81 cases of prosopometamorphopsia have been reported in scientific literature since 1904. In about half of the reported cases, features on both sides of the face appear distorted. In the other half of the cases, distortions are restricted to one side of the face (left or right), called hemi-prosopometamorphopsia.

== Signs and symptoms ==
Faces tend to appear distorted to a person who is affected by prosopometamorphopsia. Those who suffer from this condition are able to recognize faces normally but perceive them as strangely disfigured. These facial hallucinations are usually described as ugly, and have prominent eyes and teeth. Some have described the faces as having a cartoon-like quality. Faces have been known to be perceived as contorted and as having displaced features. For example, one patient described a person's face as having a nose deviated to the side, the mouth lying at a diagonal and one eyebrow being higher than the other.

Prosopometamorphopsia may either involve perceptions of the whole face or only one side of the face (usually after right hemisphere damage).

== Causes ==
The definitive cause for prosopometamorphopsia is still unknown. However, several potential theories have been expressed in the literature in this area. This condition has been associated with damage or abnormalities in various brain areas (i.e., temporal, occipital, parietal, and frontal lobes). The development of prosopometamorphopsia has been recorded to be a manifestation of epilepsy in some cases.

Functional imaging studies in humans have identified an area in the fusiform gyrus which is selectively activated by stimulation when exposed to faces called the fusiform face area (FFA). Another area known to be activated by face stimuli is the superior temporal sulcus (STS). This region is particularly active when having to process facial expressions, especially the expressive features related to the eyes. Therefore, it has been suggested that the prominent eyes (which is a typical feature in the facial perceptions) in the distortions recorded is more in accordance with increased activity (which would cause an overrepresentation of the eyes) within the STS rather than the fusiform face area.

Other studies, however, have found that stimulation of the posterior and mid-fusiform face selective regions in a patient with medication-resistant epilepsy resulted in perceptions consistent with that of facial metamorphoses (patient noted that the experimenter's face started to droop). This study found that the perceived distortions correlated with signal changes in the patient's FFA, and not in the STS.

== Diagnosis ==
=== Classification ===
Prosopometamorphopsia is considered a face hallucination and is included under the umbrella of complex visual hallucinations. Unlike other forms of hallucinations such as peduncular hallucinosis or Charles Bonnet syndrome, prosopometamorphopsia does not predominate at a particular time of day; it is a constant experience. However, patients with Charles Bonnet syndrome have noted descriptions of prosopometamorphopsia. This form of perceptual distortion along with others such as macropsia and micropsia (alteration of perceived object size) and palinopsia (spatial and temporal varieties and polyopia) are classified under the category termed metamorphopsia. These facial distortions can occur to either hallucinated perceptions or true (non-hallucinated) perceptions. It is attributed to structural brain changes or functional disorders like epilepsy, migraine or eye diseases.

There are four recognised types of prosopometamorphopsia.

- Autoprosopometamorphopsia - At least some portion of the patient's own face is distorted.
- Heteroprosopometamorphopsia - A significant amount of faces other than the patient's own face is distorted.
- Hemiprosopometamorphopsia - Right or left half of faces appear distorted.
- Zoanthroprosopometamorphopsia - Faces appear to distort into that of animals.

== Treatment ==
Antidepressants such as citalopram and the antipsychotic quetiapine have been recorded as unable to facilitate improvements for these symptoms. Valproic acid was initially used to treat a woman who hallucinated dragon-like faces and this alleviated her symptoms entirely, however, she went on to develop auditory hallucinations as a side effect. She was subsequently prescribed rivastigmine instead which reduced the auditory hallucinations and reduced her visual symptoms.

The 75-year-old woman in the previous study was treated with intravenous heparin infusion and coumadization over a period of 10 days which enabled the alleviation of her visual symptoms almost entirely. The type of treatment may vary depending on the cause of the facial distortions.

== Case studies ==
Jason Werbeloff, a twenty-two-year-old graduate student in Johannesburg, began experiencing prosopometamorphopsia after having spent months in bed with a severe case of mononucleosis. He was told to e-mail Brad Duchaine, a professor of psychological and brain sciences at Dartmouth College, who was studying the phenomenon.

In a study by J.D. Blom, I.E.C. Sommer, S. Koops, and O.W. Sacks, hetero- and hemiprosopometamorphopsia were the two most widely documented types of prosopometamorphopsia. Heteroprosopometamorphopsia is the most common, at ~69% of patients. True autoprosopometamorphopsia make up around 5%, although 25% of patients experienced both of the former. Zoanthroprosopometamorphopsia is exceedingly rare, with 3% of patients reporting symptoms.

One study reported a 24-year-old woman who developed prosopometamorphopsia after a childbirth. Initially she developed severe migraines and blurred vision mainly in her right visual hemifield and was in a confused state. The visual disturbances persisted long after the migraine had subsided several hours later. She described the left half of people's faces as "out of place" and would see these distortions irrespective of whether the faces were familiar or unknown. However, she was able to visualise the faces of familiar people in her mind without the distortions. She also did not report perceiving distortions in stimuli other than faces and demonstrated the same patterns a year after the first assessments. It was discovered that this woman had a left hemisphere lesion which resulted in distortions of the left half of the faces to which she was exposed. The unilateral aspect of the defect suggests that the early stages of face processing occurs in parallel mechanisms across both hemispheres and the right hemisphere then integrates the information that results in a unitary face representation.

Another study examined a 75-year-old woman who suffered from a sudden onset of nausea, dizziness and blurred vision. The central part of faces, especially the nose and mouth, were described as being out of shape. She claimed that noses looked narrow and lengthened toward the mouth which looked small and rounded regardless of whether the faces were familiar to her or not. She was found not to have any other impairments in her visuoperceptual performances, nor did she have any cognitive or psychiatric impairments. A T2-weighted brain MRI revealed an infarction in the right medial temporooccipital lobe including the parahippocampal gyrus (complement of the FFA).

A 52-year-old woman suffered from a lifelong history of seeing faces morph into dragon-like faces and reported hallucinating similar faces several times a day. Initially she would recognise the actual faces but after a while they would become black, grew long pointy ears and a protruding snout, displayed reptile-like skin and had large protruding eyes in bright colours. She would see these faces coming towards her several times in a day from objects like electric sockets. She has also had these hallucinations in the dark. She had previously suffered from recurrent headaches, passage hallucinations (to see movements in the corner of the eyes) and zoopsia (she saw large ants crawling over her hands). An MRI of the brain showed minor white-matter abnormalities near the lentiform nucleus and in the semioval center. The visual perceptions she had experienced were attributed to unusual electrophysiological activity in the regions of the brain that are specialised for face and colour in the ventral occipito-temporal cortex.

A 44-year-old woman reported to have begun seeing facial distortions. She perceived that faces would change to look more like caricatures of themselves, with her perception worsening over time. She had a history of epilepsy in childhood and had suffered a concussion several years before having this condition, though no medical evidence of seizure was found during distortions. She reported that occasionally she would experience a pixelated vision, like television static and mentioned that these symptoms occurred several times a week with each event lasting from a few minutes to a few hours.
