= Ken Nakayama =

American psychologist

- Education: Haverford College; UCLA
- Known for: Prosopagnosia; Super recognisers
- Awards: Edgar D. Tillyer Award (2017)
- Scientific career
- Fields: Vision science
- Workplaces: Smith Kettlewell Eye Research Institute; Harvard University
- Doctoral advisor: Donald B. Lindsley
- Doctoral students: Peter Ulric Tse; Sara Mednick

Ken Nakayama is an American psychologist. Prior to retirement he was the Edgar Pierce Professor of Psychology at Harvard University. He is now an emeritus professor at Harvard, an adjunct professor at the University of California, Berkeley (UCB), and is also affiliated with the University of Bristol (UK).

Exploring the scientific basis of human Visual Perception, he conducted research on a variety of topics: eye movements, motion processing, visual attention, visual processing of surfaces, face recognition, visual visuo- motor coordination to name a few (4). The work on visual surfaces based on new perceptual demonstrations is possibly his best, characterizing an intermediate level of visual processing previously neglected. Nakayama is also known for his work on prosopagnosia (an inability to recognize faces) and super recognizers (people with significantly better-than-average face recognition ability). Almost all of his research efforts were done with collaborators.

== Education ==
Nakayama received a BA in Psychology from Haverford College (1962) and a PhD in Psychology from UCLA (1967). Further postdoctoral work was done with Horace Barlow at UC Berkeley (1967-1969). He was briefly an Assistant Professor of Neurophysiology at the Medical School at the Memorial University of Newfoundland from 1969-1971. He was also a visiting Professor at Rockefeller University in 1996-1997. A scientific autobiographical memoir was published in 2021.

== Career ==
=== Smith-Kettlewell Eye Research Institute ===
From 1971 to 1990, he was a research scientist at the Smith Kettlewell Eye Research Institute in San Francisco (formerly known as the Smith-Kettlewell Institute for Visual Science).

=== Harvard University ===
From 1990-2017, Nakayama was a professor in the department of psychology at Harvard University, and remains an emeritus professor to this day. Undergraduate teaching at Harvard included an introductory course on Vision with Patrick Cavanagh, courses on consciousness, laboratory studies as well as lecture demonstration courses. Nakayama supervised approximately 15 PhD students and 20 postdoctoral researchers over his long career. The majority of these students established their own research careers. Most of these students are listed in Neurotree.

=== Other activities ===
Nakayama was a founding member of Nissan Cambridge Basic Research, which operated adjacent to MIT from 1993-2001. The work of that laboratory focused on understanding the "driving experience," particularly human-vehicle interaction, using cognitive science, vision, and motor control, with research areas like motion perception, attention, and developing safety systems through simulators and psychometrics.

He co-founded of the Vision Sciences Society and served as its first president.

Nakayama was a founder of the Many Brains Project, a non-profit company devoted to Psychological Testing of over 3 million subjects on the web (7).

Following the development of the Many Brains platform, Nakayama created a version for students to create their own novel tests: The Experiential Learning Laboratory (TELLab), a web platform for fostering undergraduate projects in Psychology.

All of these initiatives were started with together with colleagues.

=== Honors ===
In 2016, the Society established the Ken Nakayama Medal for Excellence in Vision Science in honor of his numerous significant contributions. In 2017, he received the Edgar D. Tillyer Award from The Optical Society (formerly the Optical Society of America, now Optica) and the Golden Brain Award from the Minerva Foundation.
