= Face fungus =

Face fungus may refer to:

- A beard
- A fungal infection of the face
