= Dave Chalk (entrepreneur) =

Canadian technology entrepreneur (born 1959)

David Chalk
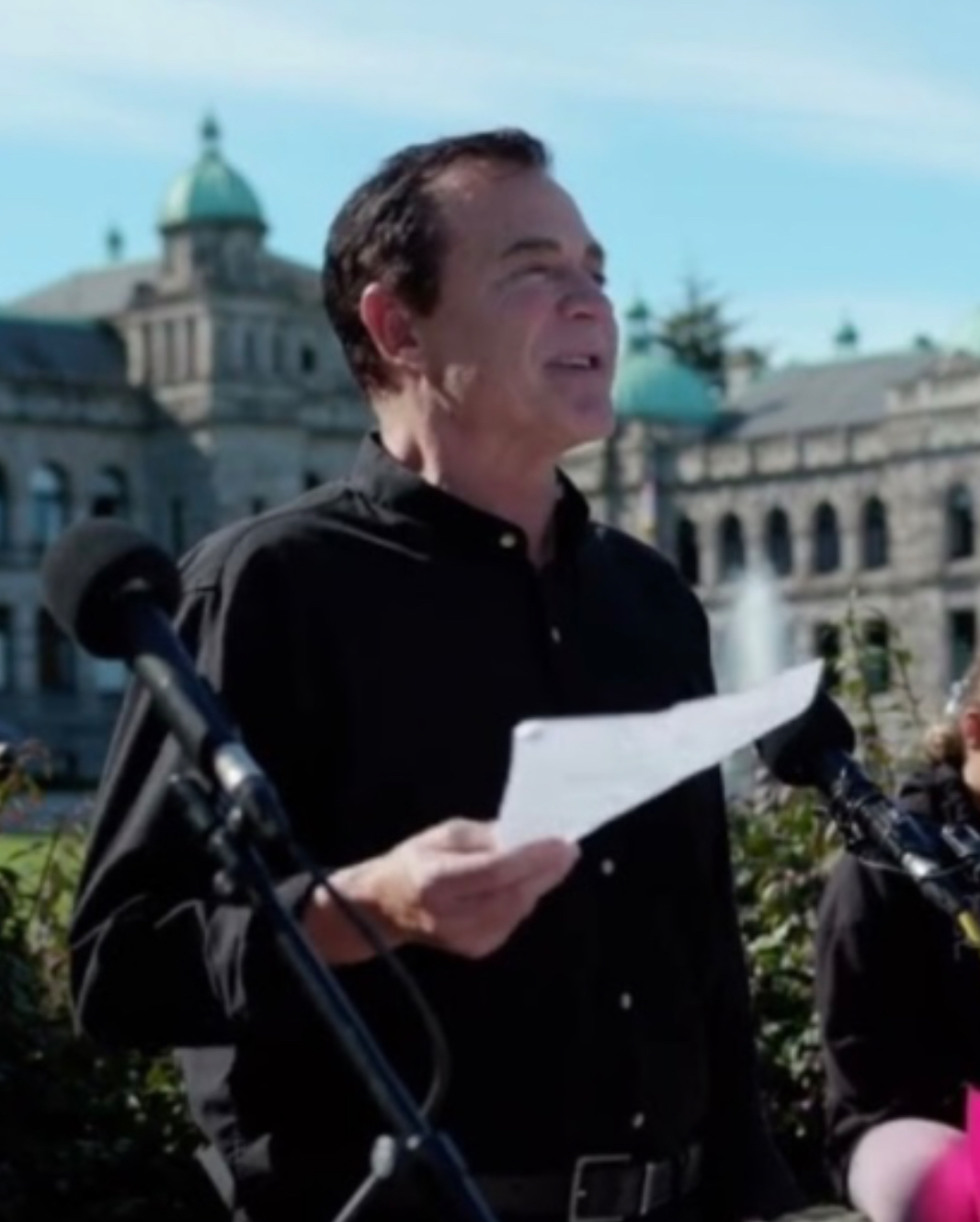
- Chalk presenting at government offices in Victoria, British Columbia, Canada, advocating for reading reform initiatives in 2024.
- Born: David Ian Chalk; September 1959 (age 66–67); Croydon, England
- Education: High School
- Occupations: Entrepreneur, media personality
- Known for: Technology entrepreneur, prosopagnosia

David Ian Chalk (born 1959) is a Canadian technology entrepreneur, cyber security specialist, and media personality who hosted the syndicated Dave Chalk's Computer Show, and its subsequent incarnations Dave Chalk Computer Life, Dave Chalk Connected Live, Dave Chalk Connected, and Dave Chalk Connected (In-flight).

== Early life ==
Chalk was born in Croydon, England in September 1959, and relocated with his family to British Columbia, Canada. He had dyslexia, face blindness, and other conditions he acquired from brain damage at birth.

== Education ==
Chalk completed high school, but was unable to finish his university degree. Despite a challenging childhood and adolescence in the public school system, he was granted an Honorary Doctorate of Technology by the University of the Fraser Valley’s Alumni Association board for his years of dedication in technology."

In 2021, Chalk learned to read and spell; the entirety of his instruction was captured on film in the documentary The Truth About Reading.

== Background ==
Chalk has been involved in the technology industry for over 25 years, from being a commercial pilot to working in technology industries. His background began with video streaming during the early days of the internet. He developed the video engine for Yahoo! 1999, which generated $60m in capital. Perio to developing video engine for Yahoo, he created Canada’s technology magazine, Computer Buyer Magazine in 1983. In 1996, he established one of the longest-running technology shows in Canada ("Dave Chalk's Computer Show").

Chalk founded many companies including Doppler Computer Superstores, Chalk Media, Trees Matter, New Century Video Streaming, and CalmWear™ Compression Clothing for Autism and most recently he helps create Mentorship programs within organizations.

== Talk show ==
In 1994, Chalk launched DTV, a television show aimed at educating and informing people about computer products and technology. This developed into other programs, including Dave Chalk Computer Life and Dave Chalk Connected, where he focused on making technology understandable and accessible to wide audience.
