= Michael Burton (psychologist) =

British psychologist

- Education: University of Nottingham
- Scientific career
- Workplaces: University of Nottingham; University of Stirling; University of Glasgow; University of Aberdeen; University of York
- Website: http://www.facevar.com/home

Michael Burton FBA is an English psychologist and professor at the Department of Psychology at University of York.

== Early life and education ==
He earned his bachelor's degree in Mathematics and Psychology in 1980 and his Doctorate in Psychology at University of Nottingham in 1983.

== Research ==
His primary research interest is in face perception and identification using experimental and computational modelling approaches. He co-created the Glasgow Face Matching Test (GFMT), a cognitive test designed to determine a person's ability to match different images of unfamiliar faces.

He has published over 100 papers in peer-reviewed journals. He was elected as a Fellow of the British Academy (FBA) in 2017.
