= Super recogniser =

Significantly better-than-average face recognition ability

- Specialty: Psychology, cognitive neuroscience
- Frequency: ~2% "Super Recognisers".

A super recogniser is an individual with exceptional ability to recognize and remember faces, performing significantly above average on multiple types of face recognition tests, opposite with prosopagnosia. It was coined in 2009 by Harvard and University College London researchers.

People with advanced facial recognition capacity can remember and recognize multiple faces with just a few exposures, even after many years. Super Recognizers demonstrate typical variation in facial recognition skills among the general population. The strength of facial recognition ability has potential applications in settings such as law enforcement and security, contributing to a broader understanding of human face recognition and memory.

Notably, this superior performance did not extend to non-face object recognition tasks, suggesting that the ability is domain-specific rather than reflecting a general visual or memory advantage. The advantage of facial identification does not represent a strong correlation with stronger overall memory encoding or higher intelligence. Rather, they are exceptional at comparing two juxtaposed images of faces, and can discriminate significant visual information about them, such as if they are the same person or not.

== Causes ==
Face recognition involves complex cognitive processes, including perceptual encoding, memory storage, and retrieval. Super Recognizers usually exhibit enhanced abilities at one or more of these stages. Neuroimaging studies suggest that face recognition is associated with activity in the fusiform face area in the brain. Compared to a typical individual, super Recognizers might show more efficient neural processing of facial information, like the fusiform face area, perhaps indicating faster activation in the neural pathway. Super recognizers might contain faster neuron activation ability in the fusiform face area that responds to stronger reflection for face-related stimuli.

One explanation for this advantage is that super recognizers rely more heavily on structural encoding of faces, focusing on stable invariant features rather than surface-level image properties. According to the cognitive models of face perception, this ability may be processed through specialized neural pathways, whereas typical observers may depend more on image-based cues that are sensitive to change in viewing conditions, like the lateral fusiform gyrus. The structural encoding in memory might relate to enhanced ability in holistic processing, which suggests that super recognizers can possibly encode the overall spatial relationships of a face rather than isolated features. Stronger interactions between perceptual systems and memory-related areas, such as the hippocampus, may also help explain their ability to remember faces over a long period of time.

Although the neural mechanism behind the super recognizer is not clearly demonstrated yet, some potential reasons might assist in explaining the ability of the advanced facial information elaboration. The genes contributing to the ability are mostly unknown, while facial recognition skills are highly heritable. It was believed that the general population had similar levels of facial recognition, and that anyone could be taught to be a super recognizer. However, this has long been proved false, as genetics play the dominant role in the highly variable degrees of facial perception the population has.

== Face Recognition & Individual Differences ==
One potential explanation for their ability is that super recognizers encode faces more holistically, rather than relying on individual features. Additionally, they might have superior long-term memory for faces that allows them to recognize individuals after a period of time.

Evidence suggests that super recognizers might demonstrate superior performance not only in short-term face recognition but also in long-term memory retention. Studies have found that even after extended retention intervals (e.g., around 10 days), super recognizers perform better than the control groups in identifying previously seen faces. Across experimental conditions with varying retention intervals, super recognizers consistently achieved higher recognition accuracy. Although the magnitude of this advantage was often modest and not always statistically significant for each individual. This implies that the observed advantage in long-term performance may primarily reflect stronger initial encoding of retrieval processes rather than fundamentally different rates of memory decline.

Studies suggest that the ability of super recognizers might emerge in the early life stage, and adolescents can also demonstrate significant strength in facial identification. Case studies have provided insight into the nature of exceptional face recognition for children, which indicates individual differences in recognition ability may continue to develop through adolescence. The ability of super recognizers might not solely result from the training, general perceptual experience, or maturation.

Research on face recognition has shown that performance varies depending on the age group of the faces being processed. In general, super recognizers demonstrate higher accuracy when recognizing adult faces compared to children' s faces, although super recognizers tend to outperform typical individuals in both adult and child face recognition.

== Measurement & Assessment ==
Although there is no single agreed method for measuring super Recognizers based on test results, several tests were created for testing facial recognition ability. The clear criteria of super Recognizers are still missing; standard clinical justification is usually identified by both memory-based and perceptual-based tests. Most research usually uses multiple types of measurement to ensure the reliability of overall results. Several examples of measurement methods are listed below.

Before They Were Famous (BTWF)

“Before They were Famous test” is a facial recognition test that participants are required to view multiple photographs of famous individuals and attempt to name them or provide unique descriptions. The usage of the Before They Were Famous test was initially mentioned in research in 2009, as the basic test for identifying super recognizers. Some researchers also use photographs from celebrities’ childhood to increase the difficulty of tests. Each photograph will be demonstrated for a few seconds, but participants have unlimited time to respond. One obvious limitation of BTWF is that previous exposure to the stimulus can interfere with the reliability of the result.

Cambridge Face Memory Test (CFMT) long form

CMFT long form is the adapted version of the Cambridge Face Memory Test, which was originally used to identify prosopagnosia subjects. It requires participants to identify 6 unfamiliar male faces in three different angles and test participants' face recognition ability in a three-alternative forced choice test. The difficulty level will gradually increase during the test, which includes 4 sections and 102 trials in total. At present, one conservative justification of super recognizers is a minimum accuracy of 93% in CFMT long form, which means at least successfully verified faces among 95 different trials. CMFT long form is assumed to be one of the most basic tests for identifying super recognizers.

Glasgow Face Matching Test (GFMT)

The Glasgow Face Matching Test (GFMT) is a memory-based cognitive test that aims to test an individual’s ability to verify different unfamiliar faces. Although GFMT was designed to test the existence of prosopagnosia, it is efficient in verifying super Recognizers. In fact, the Glasgow Face Matching test is one of the most essential tests for super recognizers nowadays. A short version of GFMT contains 40 pairs of different faces, half of which are people of the same identity and half of which are different identity pairs. Participants are required to identify whether the pairs are the same person or not.

UNSW Face Test

UNSW Face Test is an online screening tool for super Recognizers, as an additional test for the previous method for identifying super recognition ability. In the UNSW face test, participants are required to verify nearly 20 faces intermixed with 20 ambient faces in the first section. Then the participant was required to remember a target face and find the target face within different groups that contain 4 photographs of faces in the second section.

== Practical Application ==
The skill is recognised and employed among the British intelligence community.

Super Recognizers are seen as the solution to the problem that people, in general, are poor at processing unfamiliar facial information. Researchers are focusing on deploying super Recognizers in real-world settings that might benefit from their super ability. The mobilization of super Recognizers is typically for perceptual tasks such as forensic facial image matching or person-to-identification document comparison, such as policing, national security, and surveillance.

In fact, individuals who were selected based on their unique facial recognition ability have been deployed in the London Metropolitan Police. As a result, super Recognizers have been reported to have assisted in several cases, such as Alice Gross’s murder in the UK, Novichok poisonings in Salisbury, and the mass assaults on women in Cologne.

In May 2015, the London Metropolitan Police officially formed a team made up of people with this heightened capability for recognising people and put them to work identifying individuals whose faces are captured on CCTV. As of 2013, Scotland Yard has a squad of over 200 super recognisers. In August 2018, it was reported that the Metropolitan Police had used two super recognisers to identify the suspects of the attack on Sergei and Yulia Skripal, after trawling through up to 5,000 hours of CCTV footage from Salisbury and numerous airports across the country. Other police forces using super recognisers include Thames Valley Police, City of London Police, Jersey Police, and West Midlands Police.

German police forces have made increasing use of super recognisers for suspect identification, such as in the wake of the 2020 Stuttgart riot.

== Research Gaps and Future Directions ==
Despite increasing interest in super Recognizers, several limitations have been identified in the research. A major limitation in the study of super recognizers is the relatively small sample sizes used in experiments, because of the rarity of super recognizers, which may limit the generalizability of the results. This limitation raises concerns about the robustness and reproducibility of reported effects, since small samples can lead to inflated effect sizes and increased variability in results.

Another key limitation in the study of super recognizers is the lack of standardized criteria for classification. Although individuals are typically identified based on performance in face recognition tests such as the Cambridge Face Memory Test (CMFT), there is no universally agreed threshold for defining a super recognizer. Differences in testing methods and criteria make it difficult to establish a consistent definition of what constitutes a super recognizer. Currently, different studies apply varying cut-off scores, often based on statistical data. It leads to inconsistencies in how individuals are categorized across research contexts. As a result, participants classified as super recognizers in one study may not meet criteria in another.

The continuous debate about the validity of laboratory tests is also one of the limitations of super Recognizers. Individuals who practice well in controlled experiments might act relatively unreliably under real-world conditions. The factors such as changes in light, angle, and image quality might influence recognition ability. The changes in angles, lighting position, and poses might affect the accuracy of facial identification since super recognizers rely on external characteristics.

== Ethical Considerations ==
Raised concerns about the potential over-reliance on super Recognizers in missions such as criminal investigations in recent years have been discussed. Their high levels of accuracy may lead institutions to place disproportionate trust in super recognizer's judgments, potentially reducing critical scrutiny or the use of corroborating evidence. In a high-stakes environment, such overconfidence may increase the risk of error.

The use of super recognizers in policing settings also raises attention to the question of accountability. Unlike traditional algorithmic systems, judgments made by super recognizers may be more difficult to document or review since the decision-making process might not be fully, systematically evaluated. This produces challenges in determining responsibility when an identification error occurs, while potential errors in identification can have serious consequences in some policing related settings. The benefit of deploying super Recognizers highly relates to the correlation between subjects' ability and the target tasks.

Deployment of super recognizers in legal proceedings also raises questions about evidentiary standards. It remains unclear how their judgements should be evaluated in court, particularly in comparison to other forms of identification evidence such as eyewitness testimony. Establishing appropriate standards for admissibility is therefore an important ongoing challenge.

== Related Concept ==
Related concepts include prosopagnosia, which is usually described as the opposite of super recognizers. In broader research on face perception and memory, prosopagnosia and super Recognizers have sometimes been discussed together in potentially similar neurological mechanisms. Study suggests that both prosopagnosia and super recognizers rely on the eye, eyebrow, and mouth during face identification. Research comparing these groups has contributed to a better understanding of the mechanism underlying face recognition, suggesting that both impairments and exceptional abilities may arise from differences in perceptual processing and memory encoding. The main differences between super recognizers and prosopagnosia can possibly be contributed to by the differences in connections between perceptual and memory systems. Prosopagnosia is often associated with reduced functioning or disrupted connectivity within the network of the fusiform and occipital-temporal region. Moreover, super recognizers might rely on holistic facial information processing that results in prolonged memory of faces. While people with prosopagnosia may rely on compensatory perceptual cues such as voice, clothing, posture, or context rather than facial features only.

Besides, the studies of eyewitness identification are also closely related to super recognizer, as they examine the reliability of human recognition in legal settings, such as the phenomenon of eyewitness error.

Moreover, the cross-over effect in facial recognition ability is that individuals tend to recognize faces of their own racial or ethnic group more accurately than those of other groups. The effect is generally attributed to great exposure and familiarity with faces within one’s own social environment. The extent to which super recognizers are affected by cross-cultural biases remains an area of ongoing research. Some studies suggest that individuals who perform well in matching unfamiliar faces within their own race are likely to perform highly when matching other-race faces.

In addition, the forgetting curve for the human face is also one important factor in the general research of super recognizers. Research on face recognition has examined the relationship between short-term and long-term memory for faces, indicating that facial memory of a super recognizer also follows a pattern like general memory decay, with most forgetting occurring within the first 24 hours after initial exposure.

== Conclusion ==
Overall, current research suggests that super recognizers possess a reliable advantage in face recognition across a variety of aspects, demonstrating consistently superior performance across a range of face memory and face matching tasks. Studies indicate that this advantage may be related to better perceptual encoding, memory representations, and greater resilience to change in viewing conditions. Evidence revealed that special face recognition ability is specific to facial information only, meaning that it does not extend to general object recognition.

At the same time, super recognizers have certain limitations, mainly due to methodological issues such as small sample size and inconsistent classification criteria. The growing use of super recognizers in policing, border control, and security settings has massive potential. However, ethical concerns regarding accountability, bias, and overreliance on individual judgment still exist.

Eventually, current studies suggest super recognizers have a measurable enhancement in face processing ability. Continued research is required to clarify the detailed mechanisms behind super recognizers, and the establishment of general standards is necessary in the future.

== See also ==
- Cognitive neuropsychology – Relation of brain structure to psychological processes
- Face perception – Cognitive process of visually interpreting the human face
- Fusiform face area – Part of the human visual system that is specialized for facial recognition
- Prosopagnosia – Cognitive disorder of face perception
- Prosopamnesia – Impairment in the ability to learn new faces
