= 2020 Stuttgart riot =

Riot in Germany

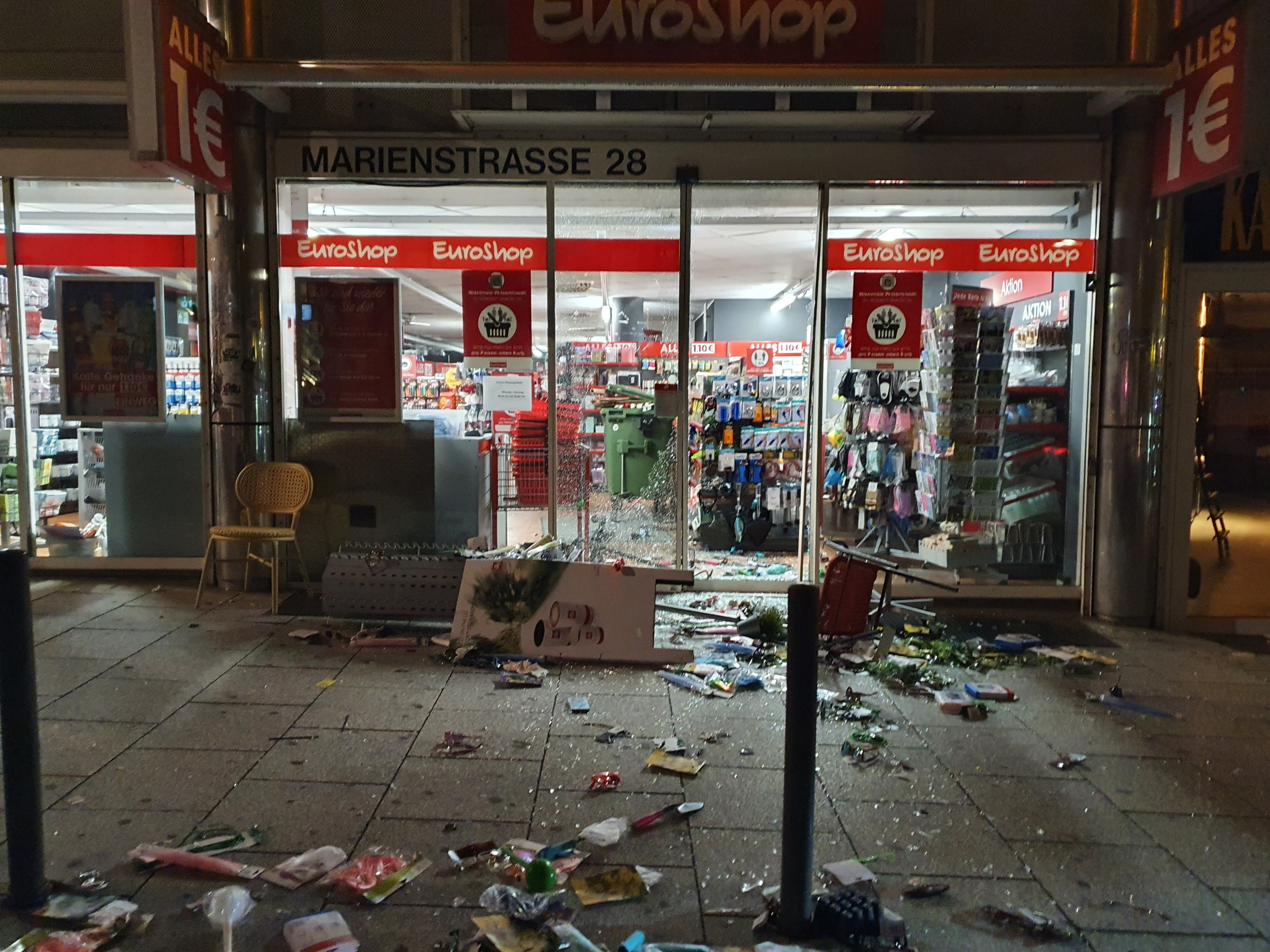
Stuttgart, June 21, 2020

The 2020 Stuttgart riot took place during the night of 21 June 2020 when hundreds fought street battles with police in Stuttgart, the capital of Baden-Württemberg, Germany. During the riots numerous shops were looted.

On 20 June at 11:30pm, police investigated a 17-year-old in Schlossgarten for the possession of small amounts of cannabis, whereupon about 200-500 sided with the accused and started to throw rocks and bottles at the police officers. The rioters screamed "Fuck the Police" and "Allahu Akbar" in videos recorded. Some rioters had prepared by wearing balaclavas while looting shops. The police apprehended 24 suspects.

The riot generated national and international media coverage.

In the following weeks, police increased their presence in the city during weekends.

Three weeks later, there was further rioting where eleven people were apprehended.

== Police response ==
Two hundred police out of the surrounding area were called to the state capital. About a dozen police were wounded in the fighting and a number of police vehicles were destroyed.

== Suspects ==
During the night, 24 suspects were apprehended, of which 14 were less than 21 years old and 7 were under 18. Half the apprehended were German citizens, of which 3 had a migration background (German: Migrationshintergrund) meaning at least one of their parents were not born as German citizens. The others originated from a number of countries: Somalia, Bosnia and Afghanistan.

On 14 July, police apprehended two further people suspected in having taken part in the violence and plunder.

At the beginning of November, 100 suspects were identified. 83 of these 100 suspects have a migration background. Several of the suspects were refugees.

== Criminal investigation ==
According to police, extreme left activists obstructed the investigations by the police, who had asked the public for video recordings during the riots. The activists responded by flooding the police website with 7500 videos, unrelated to the Stuttgart riot, totalling more than 100GB to the police website to overload. The videos did not overload the police server but would waste police time as they had to be investigated.

The German police have made a number of suspect identifications using super recognisers.
