= Prosopamnesia =

Impairment in the ability to learn new faces

Prosopamnesia (Greek: προσωπον = "face", αμνησια = forgetfulness) is a selective neurological impairment in the ability to learn new faces. There is a special neural circuit for the processing of faces as opposed to other non-face objects. Prosopamnesia is a deficit in the part of this circuit responsible for encoding perceptions as memories.

== Overview ==
Prosopamnesia presents itself in patients as an inability to recognize people they have previously encountered based on their faces. In this way, it is very easily mistaken as prosopagnosia, which is an inability to perceive or recognize faces. Prosopagnosia is a deficit that occurs earlier in the neural circuit while the facial stimuli is being processed, whereas prosopamnesia takes effect when the brain attempts to encode the processed facial stimuli into memory. Because the distinction between prosopamnesia and prosopagnosia is so close in the neurological circuit, the only phenotypic difference between the two is in the breadth of faces to which a patient's symptoms apply. Prosopagnosics cannot recognize faces, even of people within their own families over the span of a lifetime. Prosopamnesiacs show a memory for facial stimuli that they learned prior to the onset of their condition (in the case of acquired prosopamnesia) or for facial stimuli that they have encountered repeatedly for long periods of time (in the case of congenital prosopamnesia).

There are currently only two diagnosed cases of prosopamnesia. This is likely due to the fact that it can easily be misdiagnosed as prosopagnosia based on symptoms. Some doctors have even recognized distinctions in deficits of facial perception and facial memory encoding and classified them as subfamilies of prosopagnosia. This lack of consistency within the scientific community for classifying patients with facial memory encoding deficits is one reason that prosopamnesia has such rare diagnosis. Most of the current knowledge about how prosopamnesia works within the brain is hypothesized, but not proven, due to lack of case studies. As doctors become aware of the distinction between prosopagnosia and prosopamnesia, proper and more frequent diagnosis of prosopamnesia may occur.

== Symptoms ==
Symptoms of prosopamnesia may include:

- Difficulty recognizing people, especially when encountered outside any previous or familiar context
- Use of non-facial cues such as hair, gait or glasses to identify people
- Need to meet people many times before being able to remember their names
- Trouble keeping track of characters in movies or TV shows
- Social anxiety
- Having a memory for the faces of people encountered before the brain damage occurred (acquired case only)

== Cause ==
Prosopamnesia can be genetically inherited (developmental), acquired following incidental brain damage, or present as a primary adult-onset form. The exact cause of prosopamnesia is unverified, because there are only two known cases. Each group of doctors that studied the currently diagnosed prosopamnesiacs proposed slightly different explanations for the cause. Dr. Tippett's group described its cause as a "disconnection between learning mechanisms and domain-specific representations". In other words, a general dysfunction in the brain's ability to encode a representation of facial stimuli into memory. Dr. Williams's group hypothesized that prosopamnesia is caused by an inability of the FFA to maintain a stable representation of new faces long enough for them to be encoded into memory. This conclusion is partially based on the patient's differing responses to familiar and unfamiliar faces within the FFA as seen in blood-oxygen-level dependent (BOLD) responses recorded during functional magnetic resonance imaging (fMRI) tests.

== Neural processing circuit ==
Fusiform gyrus

The Occipital Face Area is located on the inferior surface of the Occipital Lobe

Superior Temporal Sulcus

Within the brain, visual stimuli are processed along many different neural circuits. Due to the evolutionary importance of being able to recognize faces and associate information with others based on this recognition, humans have evolved a distinct neural circuit for the processing of facial stimuli. Since the discovery of this distinct circuit, the anatomical structures involved have been studied in depth. The initial processing of visual stimuli occurs in the prefrontal cortex (PFC), postparietal cortex (PPC), and precuneus. The stimuli are then identified as being facial and more refined processing occurs within the fusiform face area (FFA), the occipital face area (OFA), and the face-selective region of the superior temporal sulcus (fSTS). The FFA serves low level tasks, such as distinguishing details between similar well-known objects. The OFA and fSTS serve higher level processing tasks, such as connecting a person's identity to their face and processing emotions based on the arrangement of facial features, respectively. Once facial stimuli have been processed, they are then encoded into memory. This involves many brain structures including the medial temporal lobe (MTL), and the hippocampus. Storage and retrieval of these memories involves the same regions of the FFA, PFA, and PPC that performed the initial processing tasks.

== Diagnosis ==
The following criteria are used for diagnosing patients with prosopamnesia:

- normal performance on face processing tasks that do not involve memory
- poor performance on tasks involving formation of new face memories
- normal processing of other types of visual stimuli (e.g. color, objects, etc.)
- normal formation of non-face memories (e.g. places, objects, patterns, words, etc.)

In the case of acquired prosopamnesia, recognition of faces must correspond to the timing of the injury, i.e. faces learned before the injury are recognized as familiar and faces encountered after the injury are perceived as unfamiliar.

=== Face memory testing ===
Standardizing facial memory and perception testing is key for ensuring accurate diagnosis of prosopagnosia and prosopamnesia. Many face perception and memory tests have been developed and used by researchers in the past including the Warrington Recognition Memory for Faces, Benton Facial Recognition Test and later, The Cambridge Face Perception Test and Cambridge Face Memory Test, which were developed in order to address the shortcomings of the first two tests. The Warrington Recognition Memory tests "contain abundant non-internal facial feature information" and the Benton Facial Recognition Test allows the test subject to "rely on feature matching strategies using the hairline and eyebrows rather than recognizing the facial configuration".

The Cambridge Face Perception Test allows participants to look at a target face, while ranking 6 other faces according to their resemblance to the target face. Prosopagnosics will fail this test, while prosopamnesiacs will pass it, making it the hallmark for distinguishing between the two disorders. The Cambridge Face Memory Test gives participants 20 seconds to look over a set of target faces. Subjects are then shown test cases, a lineup of three faces, one of which is from the earlier set of target faces. They are given a score based on how many of the target faces they can properly identify from the test cases. The test is repeated using a different set target faces that have different levels of Gaussian noise. A person with normal face processing abilities will score on average around 80% on this test, while someone with impaired face processing or face memory (prosopamnesiacs) will score well below 50%.

== History ==
Prosopamnesia was first proposed as a distinct neurological disorder in 1996. Doctors observed a patient who appeared to have acquired prosopagnosia after an injury to the temporal lobe. This initial patient was unable to recognize faces of people encountered after the onset of injury, but had no problem in recognizing faces of people known previously. This discrepancy caused the doctors to look at the deficit as one involving the encoding of facial memories and not merely perception. This initial case was one of acquired prosopamnesia.

More than a decade later, another group of scientists came across a similar patient. The group initially thought that the patient was prosopagnosic, based on her symptoms. However, upon further investigation, they discovered that the problem was not in the perception of faces, which the patient showed proficiency in based on normal results from the Cambridge Face Perception Test; rather, the patient showed a deficit in remembering facial stimuli, based on poor results from the Cambridge Face Memory Test. Upon this discovery, the doctors found research done in the initial case of prosopamnesia and arrived at the same diagnosis. After this instance, the criteria for diagnosis of prosopamnesia were refined from a list of specific symptoms to a more formal measure which requires a normal score on a facial perception test and a significantly low score on a facial memory test (such as those developed in Cambridge).

In the second case of prosopamnesia diagnosis, the patient reported a lifetime deficit in the ability to remember faces. This indicated that the damage to the face processing neural circuit causing prosopamnesia can be either genetic (developmental type) or incidental brain damage (acquired type).

== Implications for neuroscience ==
There are several implications for the neuroscience field that are supported by the discovery of prosopamnesia. Within the neural circuit involved in processing visual stimuli, face processing has its own special circuit. This neural circuit exists at birth, as has been evidenced by newborn babies who show a predisposition to track face-like patterns. Normal babies are also able to recognize familiar faces. This is evidenced by the fact that babies react differently (ex. smile or cry) when approached by people depending on whether or not they are familiar. Based on the theory of evolution, in order for a unique neural circuit to arise and be inherited, it must have provided some distinct survival or fitness advantage. It has been proposed that the ability to recognize faces is important for seeing another person as a friend or an enemy and that over the course of human history, as territorialism made other humans our biggest predators, this ability became crucial for survival. This circuit specializes over time, becoming more adept at distinguishing facial features among familiar people, race-groups, and age-groups. This has led to a phenomenon known as Own Group Bias, in which people are much better at distinguishing among faces of people from their same group.

Another implication of prosopamnesia involves division of labor within the brain. Patients with acquired prosopamnesia are able to recognize faces learned before their brain damage occurred. This implicates the division of labor between initial memory encoding and the storage of information, and also suggests that these tasks are performed in different regions within the brain. The distinction between prosopamnesia as a deficit in encoding face memories and prosopagnosia as a deficit in perceiving facial information also implicates division of labor within the face processing neural circuit.

The fact that there are many divisions of labor within the face processing neural circuit and other neural circuits in general causes difficulties in distinguishing between similar disorders such as prosopagnosia and prosopamnesia. There are many points along any neural processing circuit, in which deficits could cause similar outcomes. This makes it difficult to diagnose the root neurological cause of physical symptoms, a problem experienced across the field of neuroscience.

== See also ==
- Prosopagnosia
