= Face =

Front of head

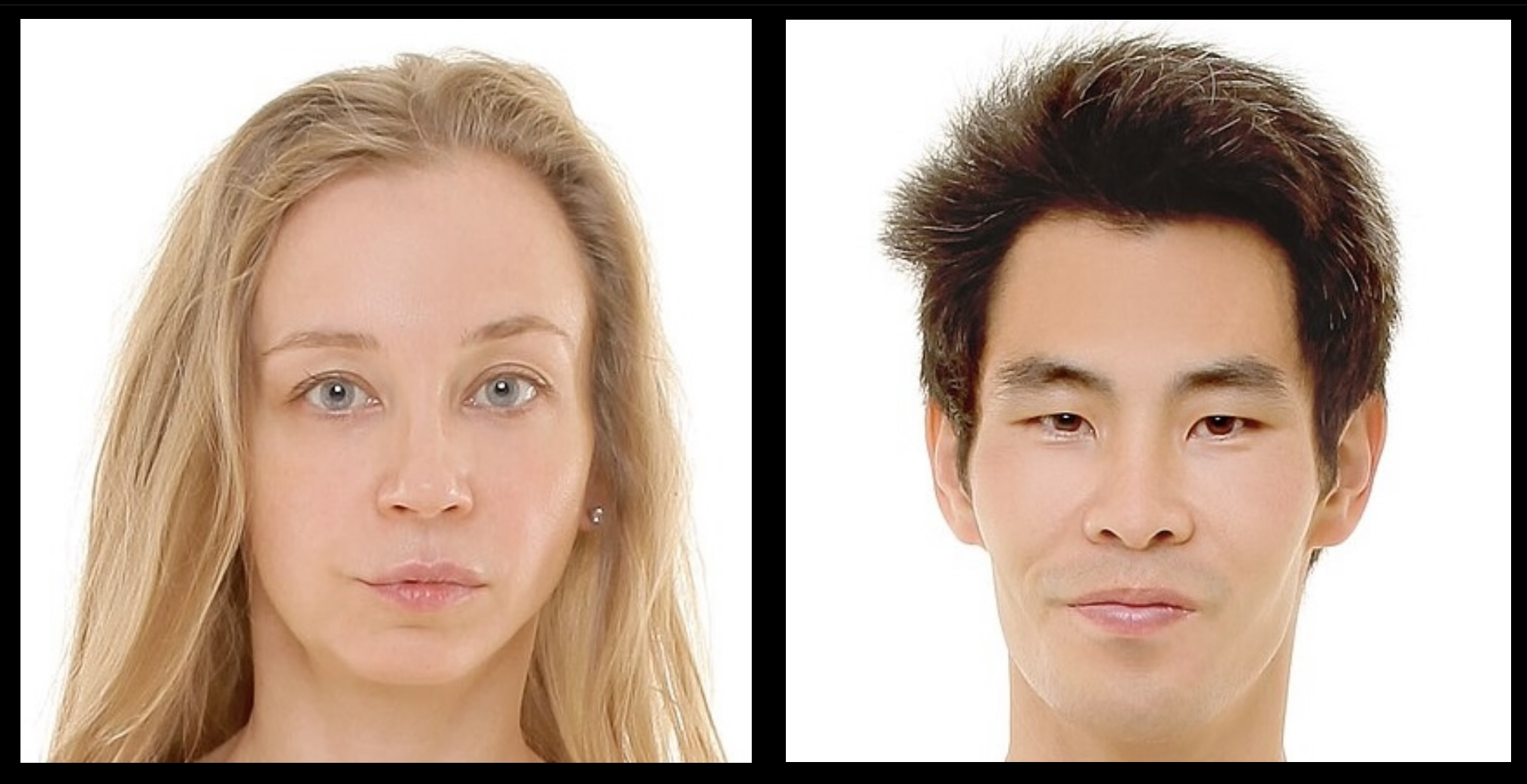
- Face of a woman (left) and face of a man (right)

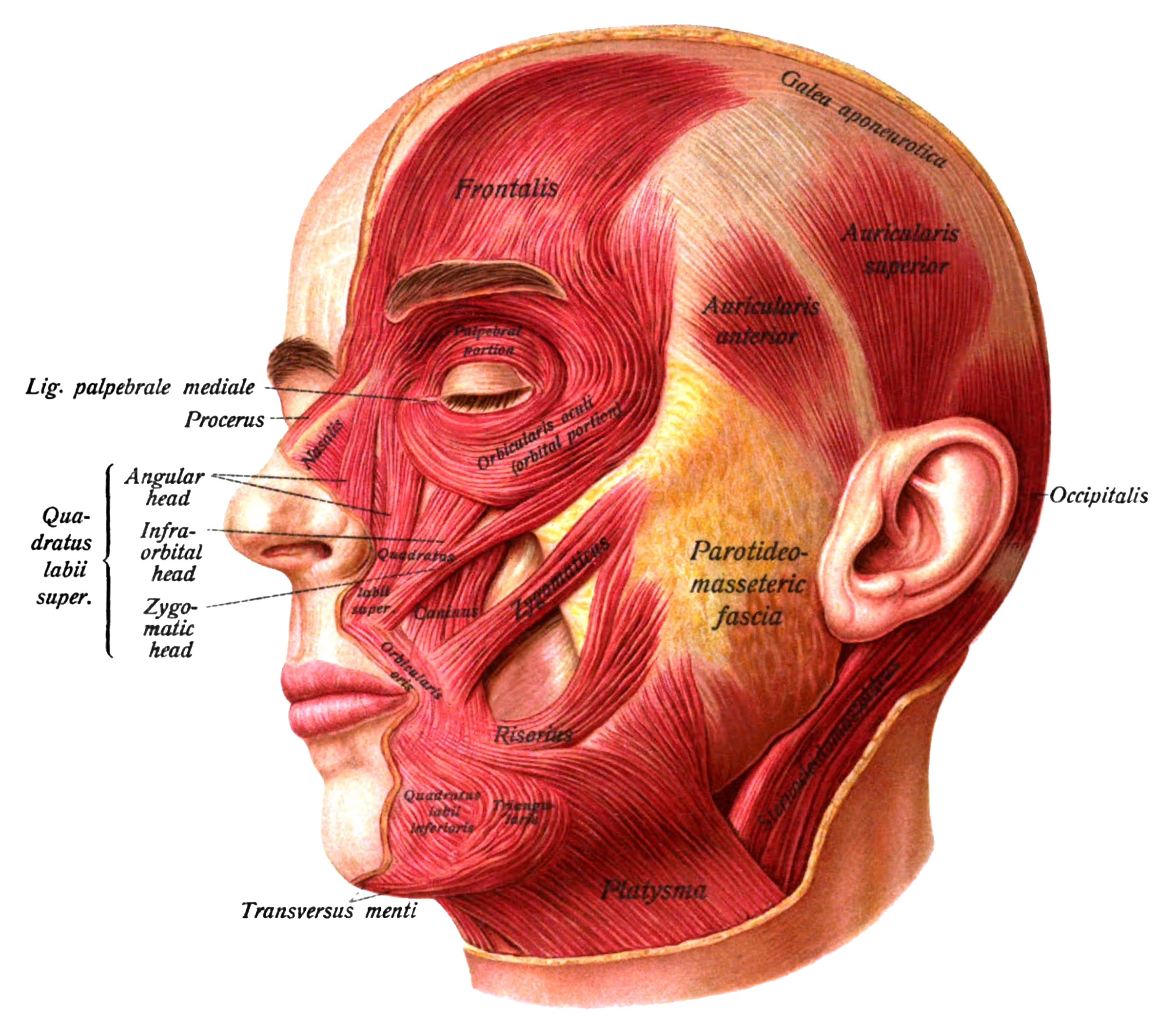
- Ventrolateral aspect of the human face with skin removed, showing muscles of the face

Details

Identifiers
- Latin: facies, facia or fave
- MeSH: D005145
- TA98: A01.1.00.006
- TA2: 112
- FMA: 24728

The face is "the front part of the head of a human or other animal, featuring the eyes, nose and mouth, and the surrounding area." While that basic structure is found in many animals, the evolutionary development of mammals has led to a wide diversity of facial types between those species, identifiable by characteristics of facial features and expressive behaviors.

In an article published in 2018, researchers Kaoru Usui and Masayoshi Tokita note that "Mammals have evolved diverse morphologies to adapt to a wide range of ecological niches. The morphological diversity of mammalian heads is especially remarkable, possibly due to the head’s fundamental role in sensing, communication, and feeding." Such diversity is especially notable in primates, including human beings.

Notable elements of primate facial morphology include forward-facing eyes, which allow for binocular vision and depth perception, and a reduced snout and nose. The human chin is unique to homo sapiens, a characteristic that sets modern humans apart from other humanoid species such as Neanderthals. That facial structure and its underlying musculature enable the human face to convey a wide range of emotions and meanings and help humans to find similarities in familial and cultural groups. On the other hand, surface differences in faces among individuals and groups such as eye color and hair color, facial hair or the lack of it, skin color, and the size and shape of features such as eyebrows, noses, and mouths, as well as signs of physical deformity or damage, may also contribute to racist ideologies and social and political discrimination.

== Human face ==
=== Structure ===
The front of the human head is called the face. It includes several distinct areas, of which the main features are:

- The forehead, comprising the skin beneath the hairline, bordered laterally by the temples and inferiorly by eyebrows and ears
- The eyes, sitting in the orbit and protected by eyelids and eyelashes
- The distinctive human nose shape, nostrils, and nasal septum
- The cheeks, covering the maxilla and mandible (or jaw), the extremity of which is the chin
- The mouth, with the upper lip divided by the philtrum, sometimes revealing the teeth

=== Facial function ===
Facial appearance is vital for human recognition and communication. Facial muscles in humans allow expression of emotions.

The face is itself a highly sensitive region of the human body and its expression may change when the brain is stimulated by any of the many human senses, such as touch, temperature, smell, taste, hearing, movement, hunger, or visual stimuli.

=== Facial variability ===
The face is the feature which best distinguishes a person. Specialized regions of the human brain, such as the fusiform face area (FFA), enable facial recognition; when these are damaged, it may be impossible to recognize faces even of intimate family members. The pattern of specific organs, such as the eyes, or of parts of them, is used in biometric identification to uniquely identify individuals.

=== Facial shape ===
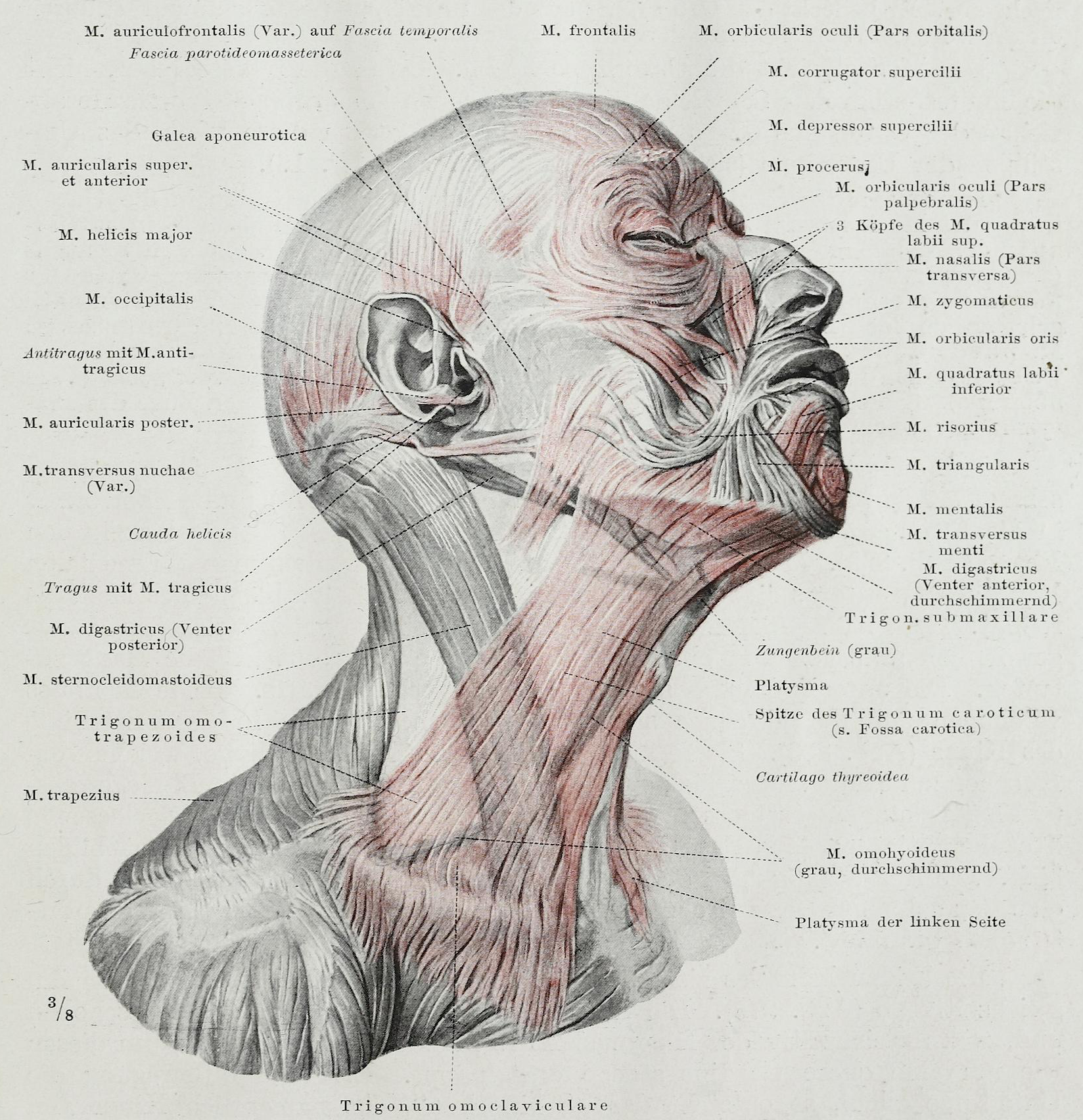
The muscles of the face are important when engaging in facial expressions.

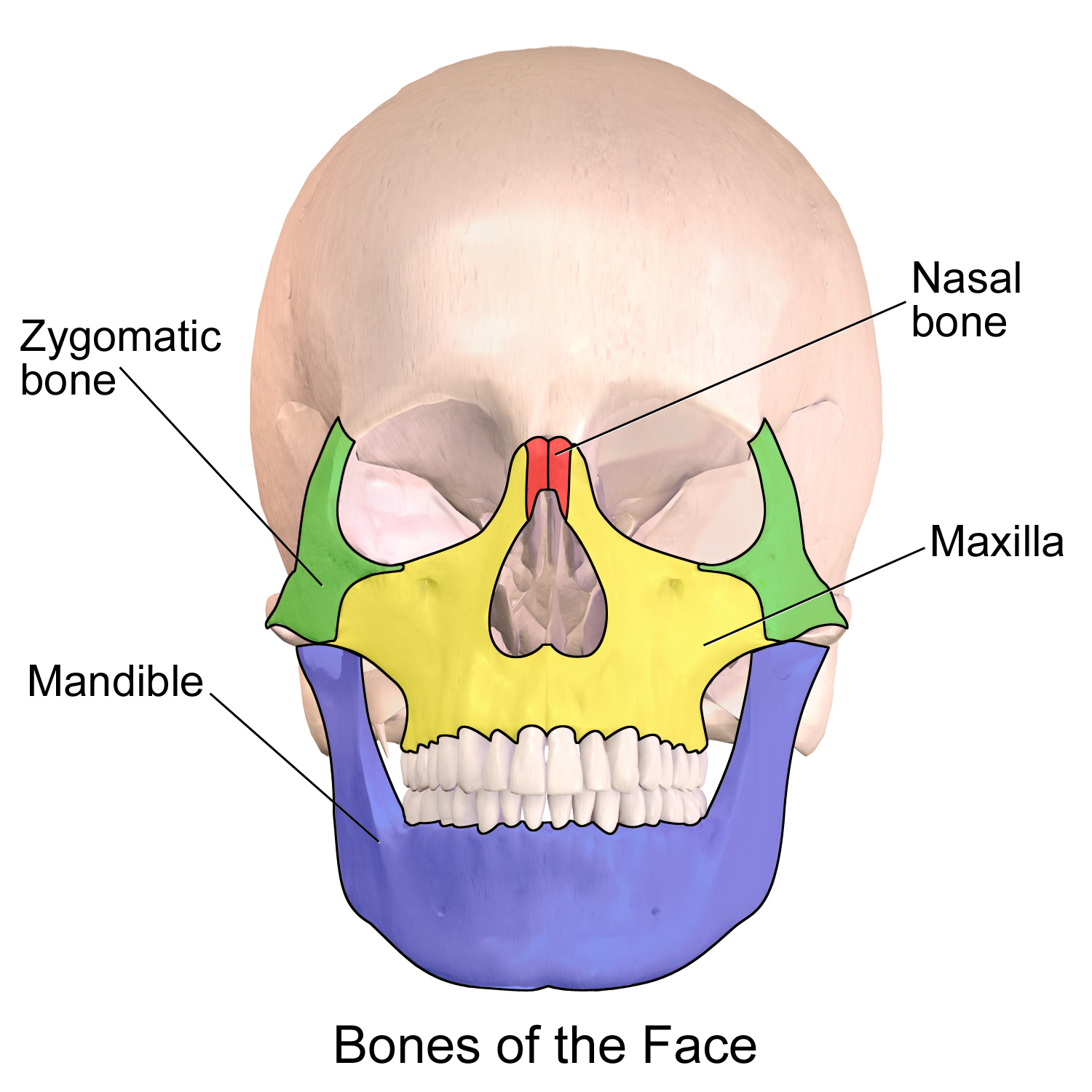
Skeletal anatomy of the face

The shape of the face is influenced by the bone structure of the skull, and each face is unique through the anatomical variation present in the bones of the viscerocranium (and neurocranium). The bones involved in shaping the face are mainly the maxilla, mandible, nasal bone, zygomatic bone, and frontal bone. Also important are various soft tissues, such as fat, hair and skin (of which color may vary).

The face changes over time, and some features common in children or babies disappear over time, such as prominent buccal fat pads, whose role in the infant is to stabilize the cheeks during suckling. While the buccal fat pads often diminish in size, the prominence of bones increase with age as they grow and develop.

Facial shape – such as facial symmetry – is an important determinant of beauty.

=== Other characteristics ===
Visible variable features of the face other than shapes and proportions include color (paleness, suntan and genetic default pigmentation), hair (length, color, loss, graying), wrinkles, facial hair (e.g. beards), skin sagging, discolorations (dark spots, freckles and eye circles), pore-variabilities, skin blemishes (pimples, scars, burn marks). Many of these features can also vary over time due to aging, skin care, nutrition, the exposome (such as harmful substances of the general environment, workplace and cosmetics), psychological factors, and behavior (such as smoking, sleep, physical activity and sun damage).

Mechanisms underlying these include changes related to peptides (notably collagen), inflammation, production of various proteins (notably elastin and other ECM proteins), the structure of subcutaneous tissue, hormones, fibers (such as elastic fibers or elasticity) and the skin barrier.

The desire of many to look young for their age and/or attractive has led to the establishment of a large cosmetics industry, which is largely concerned with make-up that is applied on top of the skin (topically) to temporarily change appearance but it or dermatology also develop anti-aging products (and related products and procedures) that in some cases affect underlying biology and are partly applied preventively. Facial traits are also used in biometrics and there have been attempts at reproducible quantifications. Skin health is considered a major factor in human well-being and the perception of health in humans.

==== Genetics ====
Genes are a major factor in the particular appearance of a person's face with the high similarity of faces of identical twins indicating that most of facial variability is determined genetically.

Studies have identified genes and gene regions determining face shape and differences in various facial features. A 2021 study found that a version of a gene associated with lip thickness – possibly selected for due to adaption to cold climate via fat distribution – introgressed from ancient humans – Denisovans – into the modern humans Native Americans. Another study found look-alike humans (doppelgängers) have genetic similarities, sharing genes affecting not only the face but also some phenotypes of physique and behavior. A study identified genes controlling the shape of the nose and chin. Biological databases may be used to aggregate and discover associations between facial phenotypes and genes.

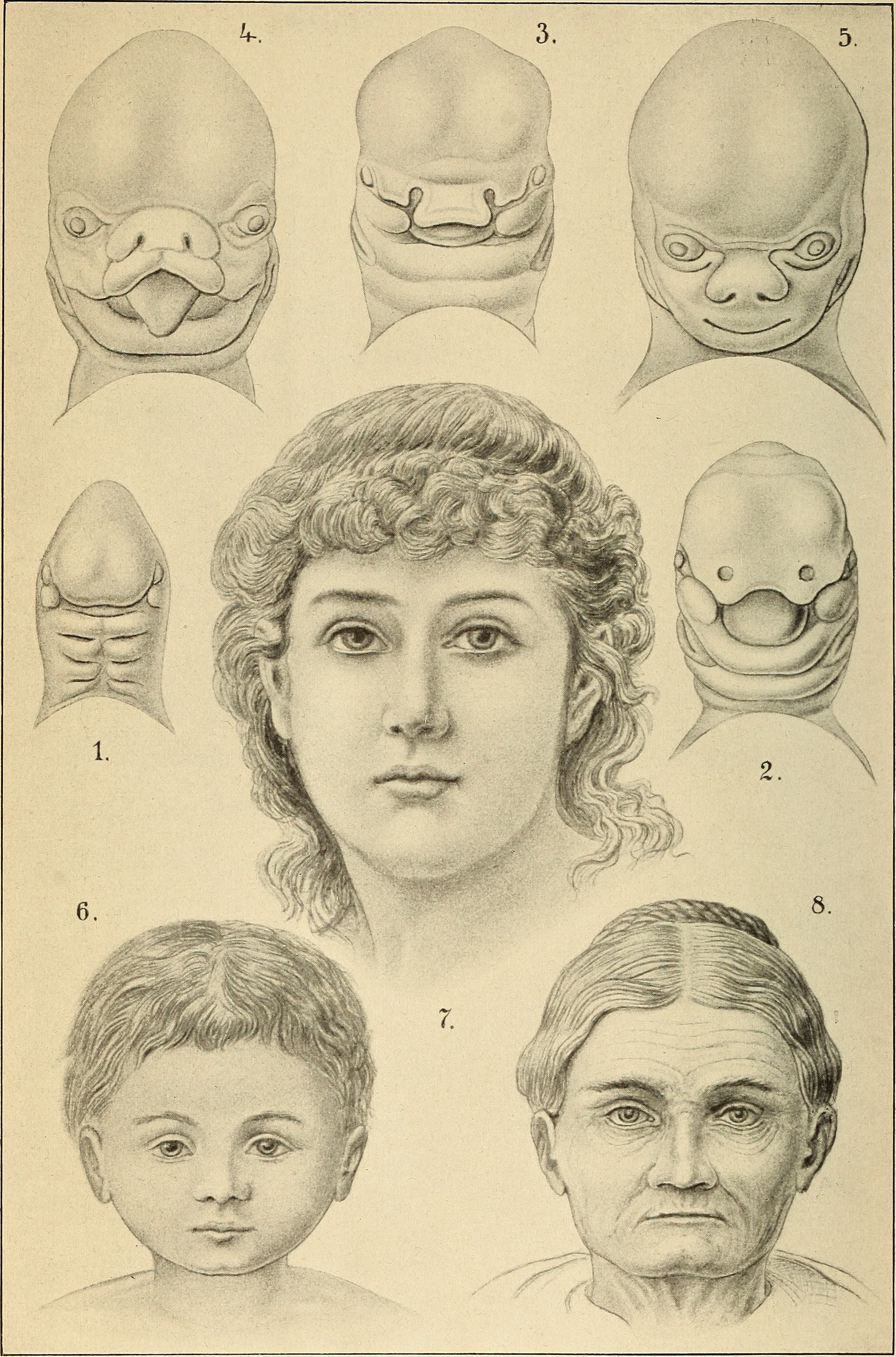
Human face development, by Haeckel

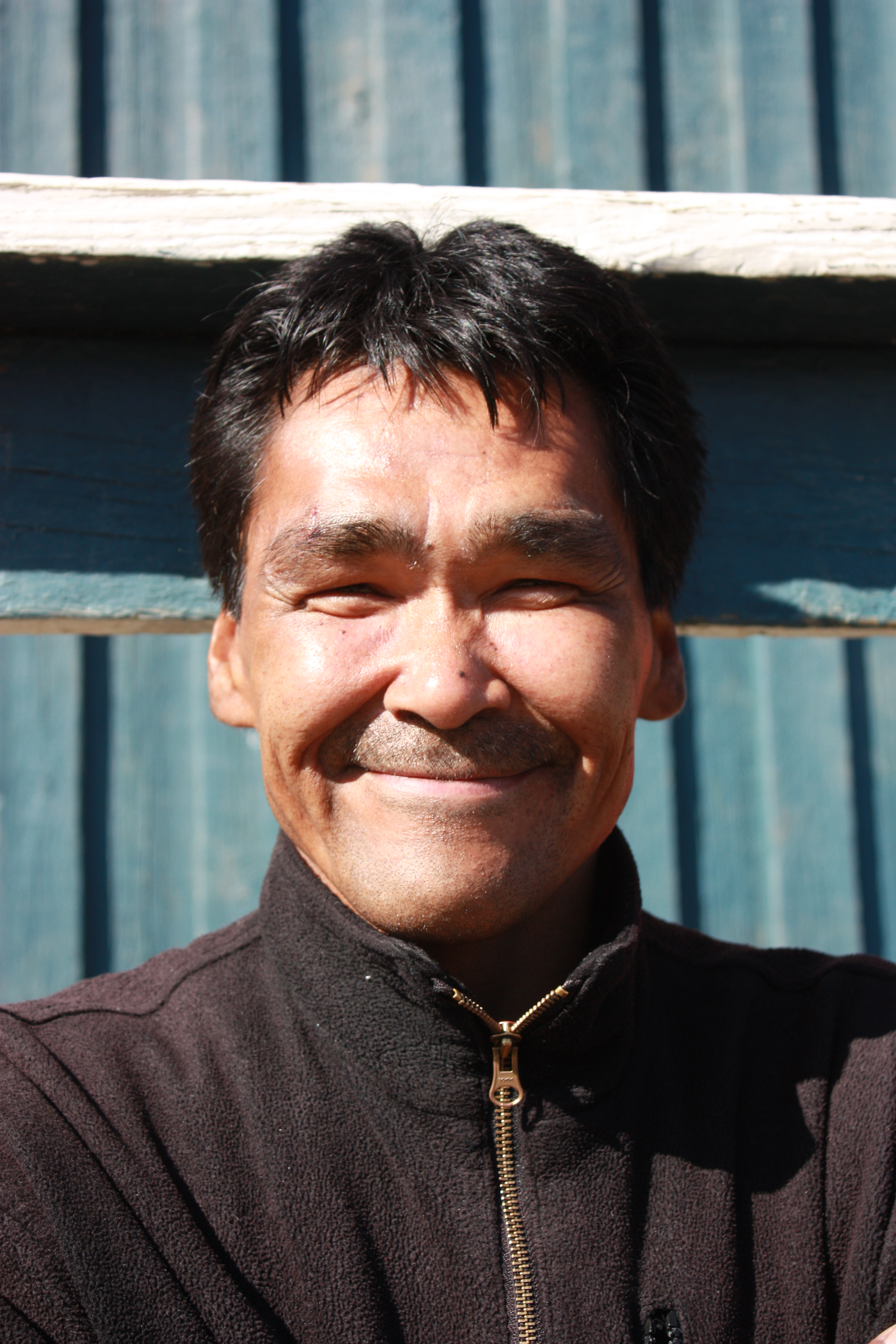
A man's face

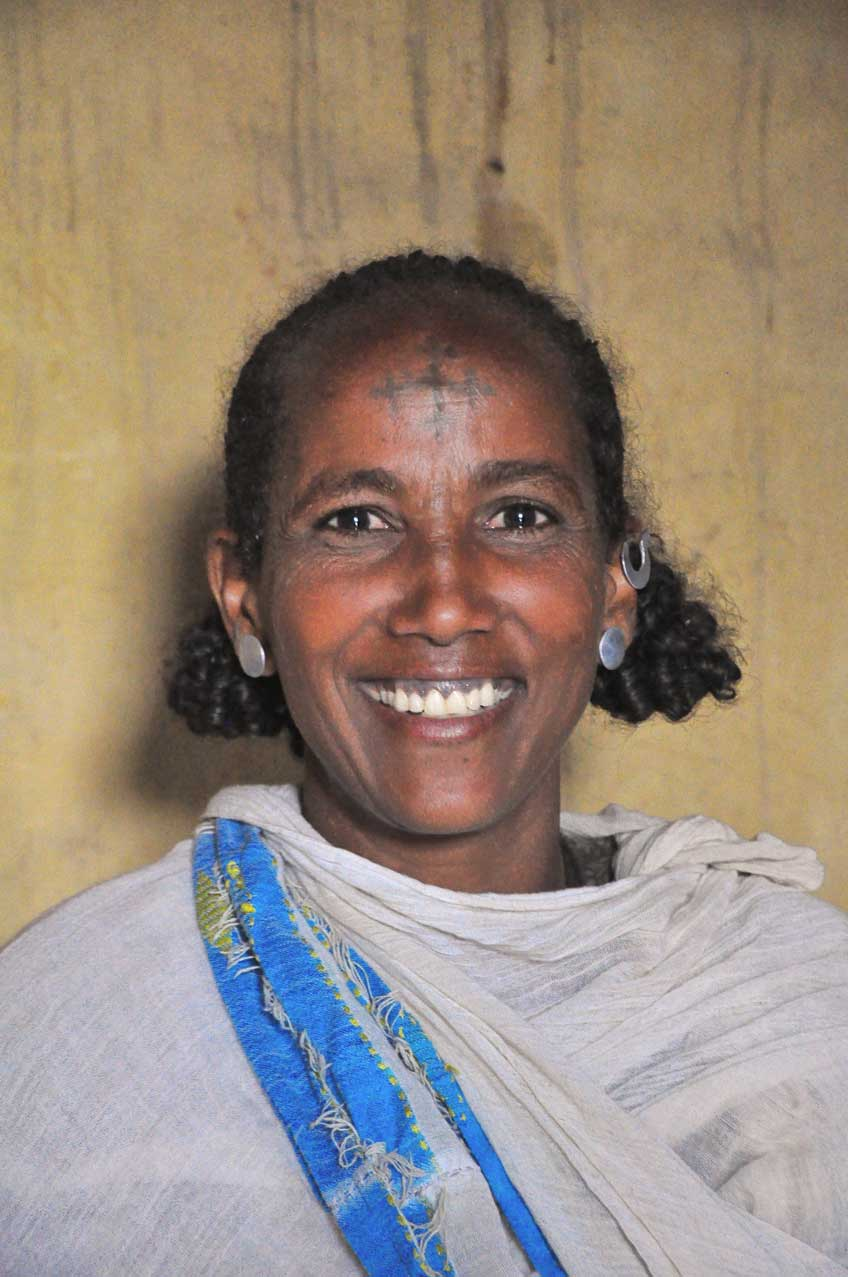
A woman's face

== Function ==
=== Emotional expression ===
Faces are essential to expressing emotion, consciously or unconsciously. A frown denotes disapproval; a smile usually means someone is pleased. Being able to read emotion in another's face is "the fundamental basis for empathy and the ability to interpret a person's reactions and predict the probability of ensuing behaviors". One study used the Multimodal Emotion Recognition Test to attempt to determine how to measure emotion. This research aimed at using a measuring device to accomplish what many people do every day: read emotion in a face.

The muscles of the face play a prominent role in the expression of emotion, and vary among different individuals, giving rise to additional diversity in expression and facial features. Variability of facial expression may be limited due to disease, nerve or muscle damage, or other factors. Such "facial masking," also known as "hypomimia," can be caused by Parkinson's Disease.

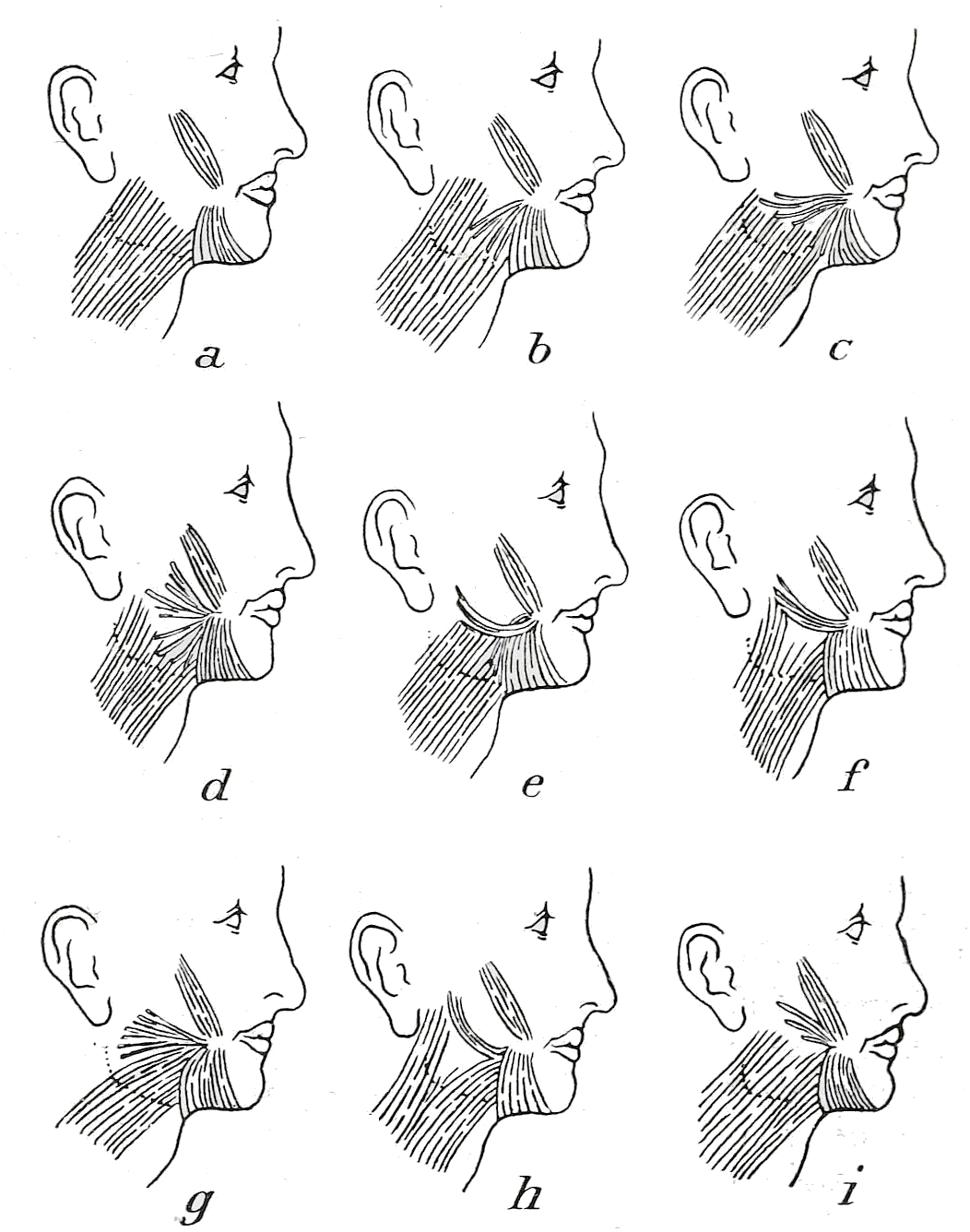
Variations of the risorius, triangularis and zygomaticus muscles

People are also relatively good at determining if a smile is real or fake. A recent study looked at individuals judging forced and genuine smiles. While young and elderly participants equally could tell the difference for smiling young people, the "older adult participants outperformed young adult participants in distinguishing between posed and spontaneous smiles". This suggests that with experience and age, we become more accurate at perceiving true emotions across various age groups.

=== Perception and recognition ===
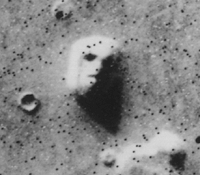
The face perception mechanisms of the brain, such as the fusiform face area, can produce facial pareidolias such as this famous rock formation on Mars.

Gestalt psychologists theorize that a face is not merely a set of facial features, but is rather something meaningful in its form. This is consistent with the Gestalt theory that an image is seen in its entirety, not by its individual parts. According to Gary L. Allen, people adapted to respond more to faces during evolution as the natural result of being a social species. Allen suggests that the purpose of recognizing faces has its roots in the "parent-infant attraction, a quick and low-effort means by which parents and infants form an internal representation of each other, reducing the likelihood that the parent will abandon his or her offspring because of recognition failure". Allen's work takes a psychological perspective that combines evolutionary theories with Gestalt psychology.

==== Biological perspective ====
Research has indicated that certain areas of the brain respond particularly well to faces. The fusiform face area, within the fusiform gyrus, is activated by faces, and it is activated differently for shy and social people. A study confirmed that "when viewing images of strangers, shy adults exhibited significantly less activation in the fusiform gyri than did social adults". Furthermore, particular areas respond more to a face that is considered attractive, as seen in another study: "Facial beauty evokes a widely distributed neural network involving perceptual, decision-making and reward circuits. In those experiments, the perceptual response across FFA and LOC [lateral occipital complex] remained present even when subjects were not attending explicitly to facial beauty".

== Society and culture ==
=== Plastic surgery: Cosmetic and reconstructive surgery ===
"Plastic surgery" may refer to cosmetic surgery, which can be used to alter the appearance of the facial features for personal or social reasons, such as "nose jobs" (rhinoplasty), while facial reconstructive surgery, such as maxillofacial surgery, may also be used in cases of facial trauma, injury to the face and skin diseases. Severely disfigured individuals have received full face transplants and partial transplants of skin and muscle tissue.

=== Caricatures ===
Caricatures often exaggerate facial features to make a face more easily recognized in association with a pronounced portion of the face of the individual in question—for example, a caricature of Osama bin Laden might focus on his facial hair and nose; a caricature of George W. Bush might enlarge his ears to the size of an elephant's; a caricature of Jay Leno may pronounce his head and chin; and a caricature of Mick Jagger might enlarge his lips. Exaggeration of memorable features helps people to recognize others when presented in a caricature form.

=== Metaphor ===
By extension, anything which is the forward or world-facing part of a system which has internal structure is considered its "face", like the façade of a building. For example, a public relations or press officer might be called the "face" of the organization he or she represents. "Face" is also used metaphorically in a sociological context to refer to reputation or standing in society, particularly Chinese society, and is spoken of as a resource which can be won or lost. Because of the association with individuality, the anonymous person is sometimes referred to as "faceless".

== Other animals ==
The cephalic index is used to classify the shapes of the skull that determines the shape of the face of many animals. In particular the index is used in cat and dog breeding, and in farming. The shaping of the skull can result in the flat-faced appearance known in brachycephalic animals.

== See also ==
- Diprosopus
- Face perception
- Facial symmetry
- Physiognomy
- Portrait
- Prosopagnosia
