= Covert facial recognition =

Unconscious recognition of familiar faces by people with prosopagnosia

Covert facial recognition is the unconscious recognition of familiar faces by people with prosopagnosia. The individuals who express this phenomenon are unaware that they are recognizing the faces of people they have seen before.

Joachim Bodamer created the term prosopagnosia in 1947. Individuals with this disorder do not have the ability to overtly recognize faces, but discoveries have been made showing that people with the disorder have the ability to covertly recognize faces.

There are two types of prosopagnosia, congenital and acquired. Congenital prosopagnosia is an inability to recognize faces without a history of brain damage, while acquired prosopagnosia is caused by damage to the right occipital-temporal region of the brain. In the 1950s it was theorized that the right cerebral hemisphere was involved in facial recognition, and in the 1960s this theory was supported by many experiments.

Although the ability for overt facial recognition is inhibited in patients with prosopagnosia, there have been many studies done which show that some of these individuals may have the ability to recognize familiar faces covertly. These experiments have used behavioral and physiological measures in order to demonstrate covert facial recognition. A common physiological measure that is used is the measure of autonomic activity by using skin-conductance responses (SCR), which show a larger response in individuals with prosopagnosia who are shown pictures of familiar faces compared to pictures of unfamiliar faces.

== Theories and reasoning ==
Many theories reside in the topic of cognitive facial recognition. First, the theory of contradiction between prosopagnosia and covert recognition. Prosopagnosia is believed to stem from damage to the ventral route of the visual system, whereas covert recognition is shown in people who have lost their ability to recognize faces, implying an intact ventral limbic structure projecting to the amygdala.

Theory two, which was proposed by Grueter, states that covert recognition cannot be observed in developmental cases of prosopagnosia. Developmental prosopagnosia is a severe face processing impairment, without brain damage and visual or thinking dysfunction, which sometimes runs in families, indicating that there may be a genetic reason for the disorder. Greuter's theory is thought to rely on the activation of face representations created during the time of normal processing.

Contradicting Greuter's theory, the affective valence in developmental prosopagnosia theory states that individuals may be processing faces on affective dimensions, feelings and emotions, rather than familiarity dimensions like the first or subsequent meetings.

Next is the dual-route models theory, proposed by Bauer, which states that covert recognition can be seen in people who experienced a time of normal face processing before actually getting the condition. With this, there are two different types of covert recognition: behavioral and physiological. Behavioral covert recognition is measured by reaction time and occurs within a cognitive pathway consisting of face recognition units (FRUs), personality identity units (PINs) and semantic information units. Physiological covert recognition is measured by SCR and is the second route that mediates reactions to familiar faces. This theory can be explained by the disconnection of FRUs, or it may be that the face recognition system is intact but has been disconnected from a higher system enabling conscious awareness.

The parallel distributing process is a theory that proposes it would be easier to relearn previous known faces than to learn new ones. This process has three steps: the distributed information is represented, memory and knowledge for some things are not stored explicitly but are connected between nodes, and learning can occur with gradual changes to the connections. Damaged networks are made less effective by zeroing the weight of the connection. Each connection is embedded and is still faintly there, making it easier to relearn.

Other theories include one proposed by Bauer, stating that neurological routes mediate overt recognition. His theory went with Bruce and Young's theory that, when using these three sequential stages in order, each stage will affect the next with overt mediation. The three stages are familiarity, occupation and name retrieval.

== Experiments ==
One of the first studies into the diversion of pathways of overt and covert facial processing was done by Bauer in 1984. This study has been the basis for most of the other studies and literature that has been conducted on the topic of prosopagnosia and covert processing. Three other larger studies were performed. Event-related potential studies were done with 20 subjects who were clear of psychological disorders. This was a face study using 315 faces and a string of characters. In each trial 30 of the faces were familiar and 90 novel faces were shown. Then, the 315 faces were shown and subjects were asked which were familiar. The faces were shown again from the first trial but without a string of letters. This resulted in higher load results for overt recognition with longer reaction time. High load tasks led to the ability to recall far fewer faces when the task was performed.

The second study was directly into covert facial recognition in prosopagnosia. In this study faces were taken from a set of 166 faces, hair and background were removed. In the first task, 36 pictures were shown, half actors and have politicians. When the face was shown the subject was asked if it was a politician or actor. Both the control and prosopagnosia patients were able to identify which faces were which therefore reaction time was compared. The second task was to say which of the faces were famous in a set of forty famous and forty non-famous. Prosopagnosia subjects had little ability to make this distinction. Further, the third task also showed forty famous faces but instead of a random string written names were used. The faces remained until one was decided upon to match the name. The covert recognition was only present in two tasks. This was not on the first task which was meant to prime and lead to the fact that the prime may be the impairment of prosopagnosia. SCR tests are often used to test covert facial processing but none of the experiments displayed significant results

== Facial recognition in disorders ==
There are several problems that may damage the ability to properly perceive faces, many of these don't have effects on both the covert and overt recognition of faces. Many of these problems only have an effect on the overt recognition of faces and leave the covert recognition intact.

Prosopagnosia is a disorder which causes the inability to use overt facial recognition. While people suffering from prosopagnosia often cannot identify whose face they are looking at they usually show signs of covert recognition. This can be seen in their ability to accurately guess information during forced choice tasks. Patients who are unable to identify faces of people that they know are still able to accurately guess information on the owners of the faces such as their professions and names. When asked how confident of their answers the patients were, they would often give low ratings of confidence despite their high accuracy during the tests. This shows that they are unable to overtly recognize the face but they are still able to recall information on the owners despite the fact that they can't identify the owner.

While prosopagnosia patients are unable to overtly recognize faces, patients with Capgras delusion are unable to covertly recognize faces. People suffering from Capgras delusion are able to properly identify a face, but lack the covert recognition that is normally evoked by a familiar face. Before the delusion set in patients would normally have a sensation of familiarity and have a heightened response to faces that they recognize. Once the delusion has set in the patients no longer feel that the face they are looking at is familiar to them and they can't access the feelings they normally held for the owner of the face despite the fact that they can properly identify who the face belongs to. This condition causes patients with Capgras delusion to believe that the person has been replaced with a look-alike imposter.

== See also ==
- Capgras delusion – Psychiatric disorder
- Cognitive psychology – Subdiscipline of psychology
- Face perception – Cognitive process of visually interpreting the human face
