= Prosopagnosia =

Cognitive disorder of face perception

- Other names: Face blindness
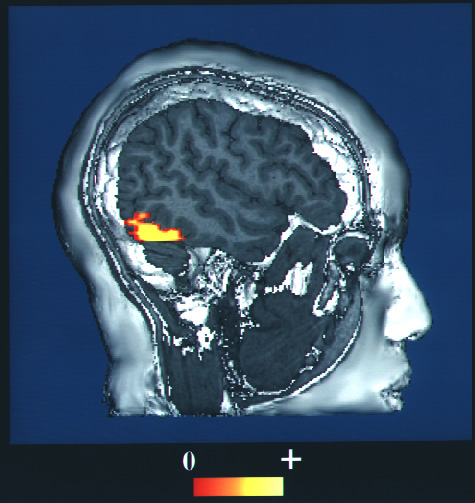
- The fusiform face area, the part of the brain associated with facial recognition
- Pronunciation: /ˌprɒsəpæɡˈnoʊziə/
- Specialty: Neurology, neuropsychology
- Frequency: 2–2.5%

Prosopagnosia, also known as face blindness, is a cognitive disorder of face perception in which the ability to recognize familiar faces, including one's own face (self-recognition), is impaired, while other aspects of visual processing (e.g., object discrimination) and intellectual functioning (e.g., decision-making) remain intact. The term originally referred to a condition following acute brain damage (acquired prosopagnosia), but a congenital or developmental form of the disorder also exists, with a prevalence of 2–2.5%.

Prosopagnosia should not be confused with prosopometamorphopsia, a disorder characterized by altered perceptions of faces.

== Etymology ==
Prosopagnosia is a medical Latin term adopted in 1948 into English from the German Prosopagnosie. It is derived from the Greek prosopon, 'face', and agnosia, 'ignorance'. The latter is formed from a-, 'not', and gnōstos, '(to be) known'.

== Physiology ==
The brain area usually associated with prosopagnosia is the fusiform gyrus, which activates specifically in response to faces. The functionality of the fusiform gyrus allows most people to recognize faces in more detail than they do similarly complex inanimate objects. For those with prosopagnosia, the method for recognizing faces depends on the less sensitive object-recognition system. The right hemisphere fusiform gyrus is more often involved in familiar face recognition than the left. It remains unclear whether the fusiform gyrus is specific for the recognition of human faces or if it is also involved in highly trained visual stimuli. Under normal conditions, prosopagnosic patients are able to recognize facial expressions and emotions.

Acquired prosopagnosia results from occipital-temporal lobe damage and is most often found in adults. It is subdivided into apperceptive and associative prosopagnosia.

Degenerative prosopagnosia is a form of acquired prosopagnosia that stems from a degenerative disease such as Parkinson's, Alzheimer's, or posterior cortical atrophy.

In congenital prosopagnosia, a person never adequately develops the ability to recognize faces, and areas such as the right fusiform gyrus are underdeveloped, likely due to a genetic predisposition. Prosopagnosia as a whole tends to last throughout one's life. This is especially true of congenital prosopagnosia.

== Treatment ==
There are no widely accepted treatments. Though there have been several attempts at remediation, no therapies have demonstrated lasting improvements across a group of prosopagnosics. Prosopagnosics often learn to use "piecemeal" or "feature-by-feature" recognition strategies. This may involve secondary clues such as clothing, gait, hair color, skin color, body shape, and voice.

== Implications ==
Because the face seems to function as an important identifying feature in memory, it can be difficult for prosopagnosics to keep track of information about people and socialize normally.

Prosopagnosia leads to social challenges, as inability to recognize faces can be misinterpreted as lack of interest in others. Using visual or auditory cues in place of facial recognition is unreliable and tiring. The condition can also be emotionally strenuous to mask, increasing the likelihood of social anxiety and depression.

Prosopagnosia has also been associated with other disorders associated with nearby brain areas: left hemianopsia (loss of vision from left side of space, associated with damage to the right occipital lobe), achromatopsia (a deficit in color perception often associated with unilateral or bilateral lesions in the temporo-occipital junction), and topographical disorientation (a loss of environmental familiarity and difficulties in using landmarks, associated with lesions in the posterior part of the parahippocampal gyrus and anterior part of the lingual gyrus of the right hemisphere).

== Types ==
=== Apperceptive ===
Apperceptive prosopagnosia has typically been used to describe cases of acquired prosopagnosia with some of the earliest processes in the face perception system. The brain areas thought to play a critical role in apperceptive prosopagnosia are right occipital temporal regions. People with this disorder cannot make any sense of faces and are unable to make same–different judgments when presented with pictures of different faces. They cannot recognize familiar or unfamiliar faces. In addition, apperceptive sub-types of prosopagnosia struggle to recognize facial emotion. But some can recognize people by non-face clues, such as clothing, hairstyle, skin color, or voice. Apperceptive prosopagnosia is believed to be associated with impaired fusiform gyrus. Experiments on the formation of new face detectors in adults on face-like stimuli (learning to distinguish cats' faces) indicate that such new detectors are formed not in the fusiform but in the lingual gyrus.

=== Associative ===
Associative prosopagnosia has typically been used to describe cases of acquired prosopagnosia with spared perceptual processes but impaired links between early face perception processes and the semantic information humans hold about people in our memories. Right anterior temporal regions may also play a critical role in associative prosopagnosia. People with this form of the disorder may be able to tell whether photos of people's faces are the same or different and derive the age and sex from a face (suggesting they can make sense of some face information) but may not be able to subsequently identify the person or provide any information about them such as their name, occupation, or when they were last encountered. Associative prosopagnosia is thought to be due to impaired functioning of the parahippocampal gyrus.

=== Developmental ===
Developmental prosopagnosia (DP), also called congenital prosopagnosia (CP), is prosopagnosia that is lifelong and cannot be attributed to acquired brain damage. While developmental prosopagnosia begins early in life, many people do not realize that they have it until later in their adult lives. Some researchers argue that the term "developmental prosopagnosia" may be misleading because it implies a developmental origin rather than a congenital one. A number of studies have found functional deficits in DP both on the basis of EEG measures and fMRI. It has been suggested that a genetic factor is responsible for the condition. The term hereditary prosopagnosia was introduced if DP affected more than one family member, essentially accenting the possible genetic contribution of this condition. To examine this possible genetic factor, 689 randomly selected students were administered a survey in which seventeen developmental prosopagnosics were quantifiably identified. Family members of fourteen of the DP individuals were interviewed to determine prosopagnosia-like characteristics, and in all fourteen families, at least one other affected family member was found. Individuals with congenital prosopagnosia have no mental images of faces, including of close relatives, but they may be able to recognize emotions. Under optimal conditions, recognition of facial expressions and emotions is normally preserved, though under more challenging conditions, it may exhibit subtle deficits.

In 2005, a study led by Ingo Kennerknecht showed support for the proposed congenital disorder form of prosopagnosia. This study provides epidemiological evidence that congenital prosopagnosia is a frequently occurring cognitive disorder that often runs in families. The analysis of pedigree trees formed within the study also indicates that the segregation pattern of hereditary prosopagnosia (HPA) is fully compatible with autosomal dominant inheritance. This mode of inheritance explains why HPA is so common among certain families.

== Cause ==
Prosopagnosia can be caused by lesions in various parts of the inferior occipital areas (occipital face area), fusiform gyrus (fusiform face area), and the anterior temporal cortex. Positron emission tomography (PET) and fMRI scans have shown that, in individuals without prosopagnosia, these areas are activated specifically in response to face stimuli. The inferior occipital areas are mainly involved in the early stages of face perception and the anterior temporal structures integrate specific information about the face, voice, and name of a familiar person.

Acquired prosopagnosia can develop as the result of several neurologically damaging causes. Vascular causes of prosopagnosia include posterior cerebral artery infarcts (PCAIs) and hemorrhages in the infero-medial part of the temporo-occipital area. These can be either bilateral or unilateral, but if they are unilateral, they are almost always in the right hemisphere. Recent studies have confirmed that right hemisphere damage to the specific temporo-occipital areas mentioned above is sufficient to induce prosopagnosia. MRI scans of patients with prosopagnosia showed lesions isolated to the right hemisphere, while fMRI scans showed that the left hemisphere was functioning normally. Unilateral left temporo-occipital lesions result in object agnosia, but spare face recognition processes, although a few cases have been documented where left unilateral damage resulted in prosopagnosia. It has been suggested that these face recognition impairments caused by left hemisphere damage are due to a semantic defect blocking retrieval processes that are involved in obtaining person-specific semantic information from the visual modality.

Other less common etiologies include carbon monoxide poisoning, temporal lobectomy, encephalitis, neoplasm, right temporal lobe atrophy, injury, Parkinson's disease, and Alzheimer's disease.

== Diagnosis ==
Few neuropsychological assessments can definitively diagnose prosopagnosia. One commonly used test is the famous faces tests, where people are asked to recognize the faces of famous people. This test is difficult to standardize. Neuropsychologists also use the Benton Facial Recognition Test (BFRT) to assess face recognition skills. Subjects are presented with a target face above six test faces and asked to identify which test face matches it. The images are cropped to eliminate hair and clothes, as many people with prosopagnosia use hair and clothing cues to recognize faces. For the first six items only one test face matches the target face; during the next seven, three of the test faces match but the poses are different. The BFRT's reliability was questioned when a study by Duchaine and Nakayama found that the average score for 11 self-reported prosopagnosics was within the normal range. One reason for this may be the way the test is designed. People with developmental prosopagnosia often use piecemeal strategies, which this test encourages by providing the target face to compare with possible matching faces. As the test increases in difficulty more and more facial features become obscured by position and lighting, leading normal control subjects to rely on the same strategy, namely looking for individual features to match with the target face.

The test may be useful for identifying patients with apperceptive prosopagnosia, since this is mainly a matching test and they are unable to recognize both familiar and unfamiliar faces. They would be unable to pass the test. It would not be useful in diagnosing patients with associative prosopagnosia since they are able to match faces.

The Cambridge Face Memory Test (CFMT) was developed by Duchaine and Nakayama to diagnose people with prosopagnosia. This test initially presents individuals with three images each of six target faces. They are then presented with many three-image series that each contain one image of a target face and two distractors. Duchaine and Nakayama showed that the CFMT is more accurate and efficient than previous tests in diagnosing prosopagnosia. Their study compared the two tests: 75% of patients were diagnosed by the CFMT, while only 25% of patients were diagnosed by the BFRT. But as in the BFRT, patients are essentially being asked to match unfamiliar faces, which are seen only briefly, at the start of the test. As of 2006 the test was not widely used and needed further testing before it could be considered reliable.

The 20-item Prosopagnosia Index (PI20) is a freely available and validated self-report questionnaire that can be used alongside computer-based face recognition tests to help identify prosopagnosics. It has been validated using objective measures of face perception ability, including famous face recognition tests and the CFMT. Less than 1.5% of the general population score above 65 on the PI20 and less than 65% on the CFMT.

=== Comorbidities ===
It is very common for developmental prosopagnosia to occur with other neurodevelopmental disorders. In a study by Nanna Svart and Randi Starrfelt, 57% of participants were found to have at least one other developmental disorder, which most commonly included learning difficulties such as hyperactivity and problems with visual processing. Prosopagnosia is also associated with contextual memory problems, which can often be present in other conditions.

Autism is highly comorbid with prosopagnosia; one third to half of people with autism have prosopagnosia. It is not fully understood why autism and prosopagnosia tend to co-occur, but there is a genetic overlap, both commonly resulting from mutations in the oxytocin receptor genes.

A wide range of disorders are comorbid with prosopagnosia, including aphantasia, attention deficit hyperactivity disorder (ADHD), autism spectrum disorder (ASD), autobiographical memory problems, dyscalculia, dyslexia, object agnosia, synesthesia, and topographical disorientation/agnosia.

== Prognosis ==
Management strategies for acquired prosopagnosia, such as a person who has difficulty recognizing people's faces after a stroke, generally have a low rate of success. Acquired prosopagnosia sometimes spontaneously resolves.

== History ==
Selective inabilities to recognize faces were documented as early as the 19th century, and included case studies by Hughlings Jackson and Jean-Martin Charcot. The condition was not named until the term prosopagnosia was used in 1947 by Joachim Bodamer, a German neurologist. He described three cases, including a 24-year-old man who sustained a bullet wound to the head and lost his ability to recognize his friends, family, and even his own face. He was able to recognize and identify them through other sensory modalities, such as auditory, tactile, and even other visual stimuli patterns (such as gait and other physical mannerisms). Bodamer gave his paper the title Die Prosop-Agnosie, derived from Classical Greek πρόσωπον (prósōpon) 'face' and αγνωσία (agnōsía) 'non-knowledge'. In 1996, Bill Choisser began popularizing the term face blindness for the condition; the earliest known use of the term is in an 1899 medical paper.

A case of a prosopagnosia is "Dr P." in Oliver Sacks's 1985 book The Man Who Mistook His Wife for a Hat, though this is more properly considered more general visual agnosia. Although Dr P. could not recognize his wife by her face, he did recognize her voice. His recognition of pictures of his family and friends appeared to be based on highly specific features, such as his brother's square jaw and big teeth. Sacks himself had prosopagnosia, but did not know it for much of his life.

The study of prosopagnosia has been crucial in the development of theories of face perception. Because prosopagnosia is not a unitary disorder (i.e., different people may show different types and levels of impairment), it has been argued that face perception involves a number of stages, each of which can cause qualitative differences in impairment that different persons with prosopagnosia may exhibit.

This sort of evidence has been crucial in supporting the theory that the brain has a specific face perception system. Most researchers agree that the facial perception process is holistic rather than featural, as it is for perception of most objects. A holistic perception of the face does not involve any explicit representation of local features (i.e., eyes, nose, mouth, etc.) but considers the face as a whole.

As the prototypical face has a specific spatial layout (eyes are always above nose, and nose above mouth), it is beneficial to use a holistic approach to recognize individual/specific faces from a group of similar layouts. This holistic processing of the face is exactly what is damaged in prosopagnosics. They can recognize the specific spatial layout and characteristics of facial features but cannot process them as an entire face. This is counterintuitive to many people, as not everyone believes faces are "special" or perceived differently from other objects. Evidence suggests that other visual objects are processed in a holistic manner (e.g., dogs in dog experts), but the size of these effects is smaller and they are less consistently demonstrated than with faces. A study by Diamond and Carey found this to be true by performing tests on dog-show judges. They showed pictures of dogs to the judges and to a control group and then inverted the pictures and showed them again. The judges had greater difficulty recognizing the dogs once inverted compared to the control group; the inversion effect, the increased difficulty in recognizing a picture once inverted, was shown to be in effect. It was previously believed that the inversion effect was associated only with faces, but this study found that it may apply to any category of expertise.

It has also been argued that prosopagnosia is a general impairment in understanding how individual perceptual components make up the structure or gestalt of an object. Psychologist Martha Farah has been particularly associated with this view.

== Children ==
Developmental prosopagnosia can be a difficult thing for a child to both understand and cope with. Many adults with developmental prosopagnosia report that for a long time they had no idea that they had a deficit in face processing, unaware that others could distinguish people solely on facial differences. Individuals with congenital prosopagnosia have no mental images of faces, even though they may be able to normally distinguish emotions.

Prosopagnosia in children may be overlooked; they may just appear to be very shy or slightly odd due to their inability to recognize faces. They may also have a hard time making friends, as they may not recognize their classmates. They often make friends with children who have very clear, distinguishing features. Children with prosopagnosia can have a particularly difficult time at school, as many school professionals are not well versed in prosopagnosia, if they are aware of the disorder at all. Recently, a database of children's faces and test for child face perception has been developed, which may offer professionals a way to evaluate if a child has prosopagnosia.

Children with prosopagnosia may also have difficulties following the plots of television shows and movies, as they have trouble recognizing the different characters. Many tend to gravitate to animation, in which characters have simple but well-defined characteristics, tend to wear the same clothes, may have skin of strikingly different colors, and may even belong to different species. Prosopagnosic children can even have a hard time telling family members apart, or recognizing people out of context (e.g., the teacher in a grocery store). Some have difficulty recognizing themselves in group photographs.

Prosopagnosia particularly in children poses a special risk of danger, as the inability to accurately recognize familiar faces or the misidentification and lack of fear of strangers can put the child in an unsafe situation.

== Notable people ==
The following is a list of public figures and other notable people with prosopagnosia.

- Alan Alda (born 1936), American actor
- Duncan Bannatyne (born 1949), Scottish entrepreneur
- Sara Benincasa (born 1980) American comedian and author
- Dave Chalk (born 1963), Canadian entrepreneur
- Chuck Close (1940–2021), American painter
- Paul Foot (born 1973), English comedian
- David Frost, Baron Frost (born 1965), British diplomat, civil servant and politician.
- Stephen Fry (born 1957), English actor
- Robert Gascoyne-Cecil, 3rd Marquess of Salisbury (1830–1903)
- Jane Goodall (1934–2025), English primatologist
- Anne Hegerty (born 1958), British professional quizzer and television personality. She has autism-related prosopagnosia.
- John Hickenlooper (born 1952), U.S. Senator and former Governor of Colorado
- Margaret Kerry (1929–2026), American actress and reference model for Tinker Bell
- Karl Kruszelnicki (born 1948), Australian science communicator
- Joanna Lumley (born 1946), Indian-born British actress, presenter, former model, author, television producer, and activist
- Markos Moulitsas (born 1971), American blogger and founder of DailyKos.com
- Brad Pitt (born 1963), American actor and film producer
- Oliver Sacks (1933–2015), British neurologist
- Mary Ann Sieghart (born 1961), English journalist and radio presenter
- Victoria, Crown Princess of Sweden (born 1977)
- Rebecca Watson (born 1980), U.S.-based atheist blogger and YouTube contributor.
- Gene Weingarten, American humorist
- Jim Woodring (born 1952), American cartoonist
- Steve Wozniak (born 1950), American computer engineer and co-founder of Apple Inc.

== In popular culture ==
- In the 1965 British comedy film Those Magnificent Men in Their Flying Machines, Pierre DuBois (Jean-Pierre Cassel) meets several girls of different nationalities, whom he perceives as all having the face of Irina Demick.
- The protagonists of the films Faces in the Crowd and Prasanna Vadanam are afflicted with this disorder due to brain injury.
- The fictional character Marky Bark from the television show Arrested Development has the disorder.
- A character in the video game 999: Nine Hours, Nine Persons, Nine Doors has prosopagnosia.
- The protagonist of the 2018 South Korean drama The Beauty Inside (뷰티 인사이드) has prosopagnosia.
- The character Inga Karkhuul Khura'in in the video game Phoenix Wright: Ace Attorney – Spirit of Justice has prosopagnosia.
- The protagonist of the NBC television series Brilliant Minds, neurologist Dr. Oliver Wolfe, played by Zachary Quinto, has prosopagnosia.
- In Rizzoli & Isles, season 6, episode 6, "Face Value", a witness has prosopagnosia, causing trouble for the detectives.
- In Trial & Error, Josh's assistant and head researcher, Anne Flatch (played by Sherri Shephard), has numerous medical conditions, the main (and most regularly mentioned) being prosopagnosia.
- In the light novel The Apothecary Diaries, the protagonist's father, Lakan, has prosopagnosia, where he sees faces as shogi pieces or as pieces from the game Go.
- The main character in The Color of Bee Larkham's Murder has prosopagnosia (as well as autism and synesthesia).
- The protagonist Han So-yeon (played by Ko Sung-hee), from the South Korean television series My Holo Love, has prosopagnosia.
- In the 2025 Malayalam-language action thriller film Identity, the character Alisha Abdul Salam (played by Trisha Krishnan) has prosopagnosia.
- Will Wood's 2016 album Self-ish includes a song titled "Mr. Capgras Encounters a Secondhand Vanity: Tulpamancer's Prosopagnosia/Pareidolia (As Direct Result of Trauma to the Fusiform Gyrus)".

== See also ==
- Alexithymia – Deficiency in understanding, processing, or describing emotions
- Amygdala – Paired structure within the brain temporal lobe
- Aphantasia – Inability to picture something in one's mind
- Biometrics – Metrics related to human characteristics
- Cognitive neuropsychology – Relation of brain structure to psychological processes
- Covert facial recognition
- Face perception – Cognitive process of visually interpreting the human face
- Fregoli delusion – Mental disorder
- Ken Nakayama – Prosopagnosia researcher
- Mirrored-self misidentification – Delusional belief that one's reflection in the mirror is another person
- N170 – Brain response to faces
- Prosopamnesia – Impairment in the ability to learn new faces
- Prosopometamorphopsia – Visual disorder
- Social-emotional agnosia – Lack of ability to perceive body language
- Super recognizer – Significantly better-than-average face recognition ability
- Temporal lobe epilepsy – Chronic focal seizure disorder
- Thatcher effect – Optical illusion
- Visual agnosia – Impairment in recognition of visually presented objects
