= Intellectual functioning =

Mental Function

Intellectual functioning refers to the "general mental ability that includes reasoning, planning, problem solving, abstract thinking, comprehending complex ideas, learning quickly and learning from experience". Significantly limited or impaired intellectual functioning characterizes intellectual disabilities.

Ageing has been shown to cause a decline in intellectual functioning.

== See also ==
- Human intelligence
- Intellectual disability
- Emotional or behavioral disability
- Borderline intellectual functioning
- American Association on Intellectual and Developmental Disabilities
