= Justine Sergent =

Lebanese neurosurgeon

- Born: March 31, 1950; Lebanon
- Died: April 11, 1994 (aged 44); Montreal, Quebec, Canada
- Cause of death: Suicide
- Citizenship: Canada
- Education: McGill University (PhD)
- Occupations: Neurosurgeon and researcher in cognitive neuroscience
- Known for: Functional neuroanatomy of face processing: the Fusiform face area
- Spouse: Sergent
- Scientific career
- Fields: Neuropsychology
- Workplaces: McGill University

Justine Saade-Sergent (March 31, 1950 – April 11, 1994) was a researcher in the cognitive neuroscience field. From 1979 to 1982, she was an associate professor of neurology and neurosurgery at the Montreal Neurological Institute at McGill University.

Saade-Sergent was considered a top scientist in her field, until she was anonymously accused of violating research ethics. Attacks on her character and research caused significant stress. She and her husband died by suicide together less than two years later. Three years after her death, the inquiry was unable to come up with any evidence of fraud.

== Early life and education ==
Saade-Sergent was born March 31, 1950, in Lebanon. While teaching there, she met her later-to-be husband Yves Sergent. They then moved to France where they married. Saade-Sergent later enrolled at McGill University where she earned her bachelor's, master's, and doctoral degrees.

== Research ==
Saade-Sergent was one of the first researchers that brought forth evidence towards the functional neuroanatomy of face processing. She described the Fusiform face area (FFA) in 1992. Using positron emission tomography (PET), Sergent found that there were different patterns of activation in response to the two different required tasks, face processing and object processing. This processing area was later named by Nancy Kanwisher in 1997, who proposed that the existence of the FFA is evidence for domain specificity in the visual system.

== Scandal and death ==
In July 1992 an anonymous letter sent to the Montreal Gazette accused Saade-Sergent of violating ethical research procedures at McGill University, specifically of failing to get approval from an ethics committee for her research on the brain function of pianists. The research included the use of a PET scan, which requires the injection of radioactive isotopes. Saade-Sergent responded that the approval remained in effect, since nothing in the original experiment for which she had gotten approval had changed, but the stimuli had (subjects were now looking at musical notes, rather than letters). In 1993, then-principal of McGill David Johnston reprimanded Saade-Sergent for her failure to report this change in stimuli in her experiments to the ethics committee.

Almost two years after the first anonymous letter was sent out, several copies of another anonymous letter were sent out. The letter attempted to link Saade-Sergent's research conduct to the case of a Dr. Roger Poisson of St. Luc Hospital. Poisson had admitted to falsifying records in his breast cancer research. One of these letters was received by the Montreal Gazette, and on April 9, 1994, they published an article on Saade-Sergent's 1993 reprimand. The weekend after this article was published, Saade-Sergent and her husband were found dead in their garage from carbon monoxide poisoning. The coroner pronounced their time of death 11:40 AM on April 12, 1994. There was a suicide note citing the anonymous letter as a reason for their suicide. The note was published in both the Gazette and La Presse.

An inquiry into Johnston's actions against Saade-Sergent at McGill University, and her alleged ethical violations, was suspended on July 15, 1997, by Saade-Sergent's estate.

== Selected academic publications ==
=== Posthumous ===
- Parsons, Lawrence M.; Sergent, Justine; Hodges, Donald A.; Fox, Peter T. (2005). "The brain basis of piano performance". Neuropsychologia. 43 (2): 199–215. doi:10.1016/j.neuropsychologia.2004.11.007. PMID 15707905. S2CID 15369135.

=== 1990s ===
- Sergent, J (1994). "Brain-imaging studies of cognitive functions". Trends in Neurosciences. 17 (6): 221–227. doi:10.1016/0166-2236(94)90002-7. PMID 7521081. S2CID 23395774.
- Sergent, J (1994). "La mémoire des visages". La Recherche. 267: 792–797.
- Sergent, J (1993). "Mapping the musician brain". Human Brain Mapping. 1 (1): 20–38. doi:10.1002/hbm.460010104. S2CID 144502262.
- Sergent, J (1992). "Functional neuroanatomy of face and object processing : A positron emission tomography study". Brain. 115 (1): 15–36. doi:10.1093/brain/115.1.15. PMID 1559150.
- Sergent, J (1990). "The neuropsychology of visual image generation: Data, method, and theory". Brain and Cognition. 13 (1): 98–129. doi:10.1016/0278-2626(90)90043-N. PMID 2189446. S2CID 12919853.

=== 1980s ===
- Sergent, J (1989). "Image generation and processing of generated images in the cerebral hemispheres". Journal of Experimental Psychology: Human Perception and Performance. 15 (1): 170–178. doi:10.1037/0096-1523.15.1.170. PMID 2522527.
- Sergent, J (1987). "Failures to confirm the spatial-frequency hypothesis : Fatal blow or healthy complication?". Canadian Journal of Experimental Psychology. 41 (4): 412–428. doi:10.1037/h0084170. PMID 3502907.
- Sergent, J (1984). "Role of contrast, lettercase, and viewing conditions in a lateralized word-naming task". Perception & Psychophysics. 35 (5): 489–498. doi:10.3758/BF03203925. PMID 6462875.
- Sergent, J. (1982). Influence of input characteristics on hemispheric cognitive processing. McGill University, Thesis for Ph.D.
- Sergent, J.; Bindra, D. (1981). "Differential hemispheric processing of faces: Methodological considerations and reinterpretation". Psychological Bulletin. 89 (3): 541–554. doi:10.1037/0033-2909.89.3.541. PMID 7255628.

=== 1970s ===
- Sergent, J., Lambert, W. E. Learned helplessness or "learned incompetence"? Can J Behav Sci, 11(4), 257-273 (1979)
- Sergent, J., Binik, Y. M. On the Use of Symmetry in the Rorschach Test. Journal of Personality Assessment, Volume 43, Issue 4, 1979. pp. 355–359.

== In memoriam ==
- The Justine and Yves Sergent International Prize in Cognitive Neuroscience
- The Justine and Yves Sergent Conference
- Eve Séguin, "Mobbing, ou l'extermination concertée d'une cible humaine"
