= List of discoveries influenced by chance circumstances =

Below are discoveries in science that involve chance circumstances in a particularly salient way. This page should not list all chance involved in all discoveries (i.e. it should focus on discoveries reported for their notable circumstances).

== Overview ==
Royston Roberts says that various discoveries required a degree of genius, but also some lucky element for that genius to act on. Richard Gaughan writes that accidental discoveries result from the convergence of preparation, opportunity, and desire.

Major everyday discoveries that were helped by luck in some way include products like vulcanized rubber, teflon, nylon, penicillin, cyanoacrylate (Super Glue), the implantable pacemaker, the microwave oven, Scotchgard, Saran wrap, Silly Putty, Slinky, safety glass, propeller, snowmaking, stainless steel, Perkin's mauve, and popsicles. Most artificial sweeteners have been discovered when accidentally tasted, including aspartame and saccharin.

Ideas include the theory of the Big Bang, tissue culture, radio astronomy, and the discovery of DNA.

Such archeological discoveries as the Rosetta Stone, the Dead Sea Scrolls and the ruins of Pompeii also emerged partly out of serendipity.

Many relevant and well known scientific theories were developed by chance at some degree along history. According to a legend, Archimedes realized his principle on hydrostatics when he entered in a bath full of water, which overflows (he then shouted out his famous "Eureka!"). And the unexpected, negative results of the Michelson–Morley experiment in their search of the luminiferous aether ultimately led to the special theory of relativity by Albert Einstein.

The optical illusion called the "flashed face distortion effect" suggests a new area of research in the neurology of face perception.

== Detailed examples ==
=== Newton and gravity ===
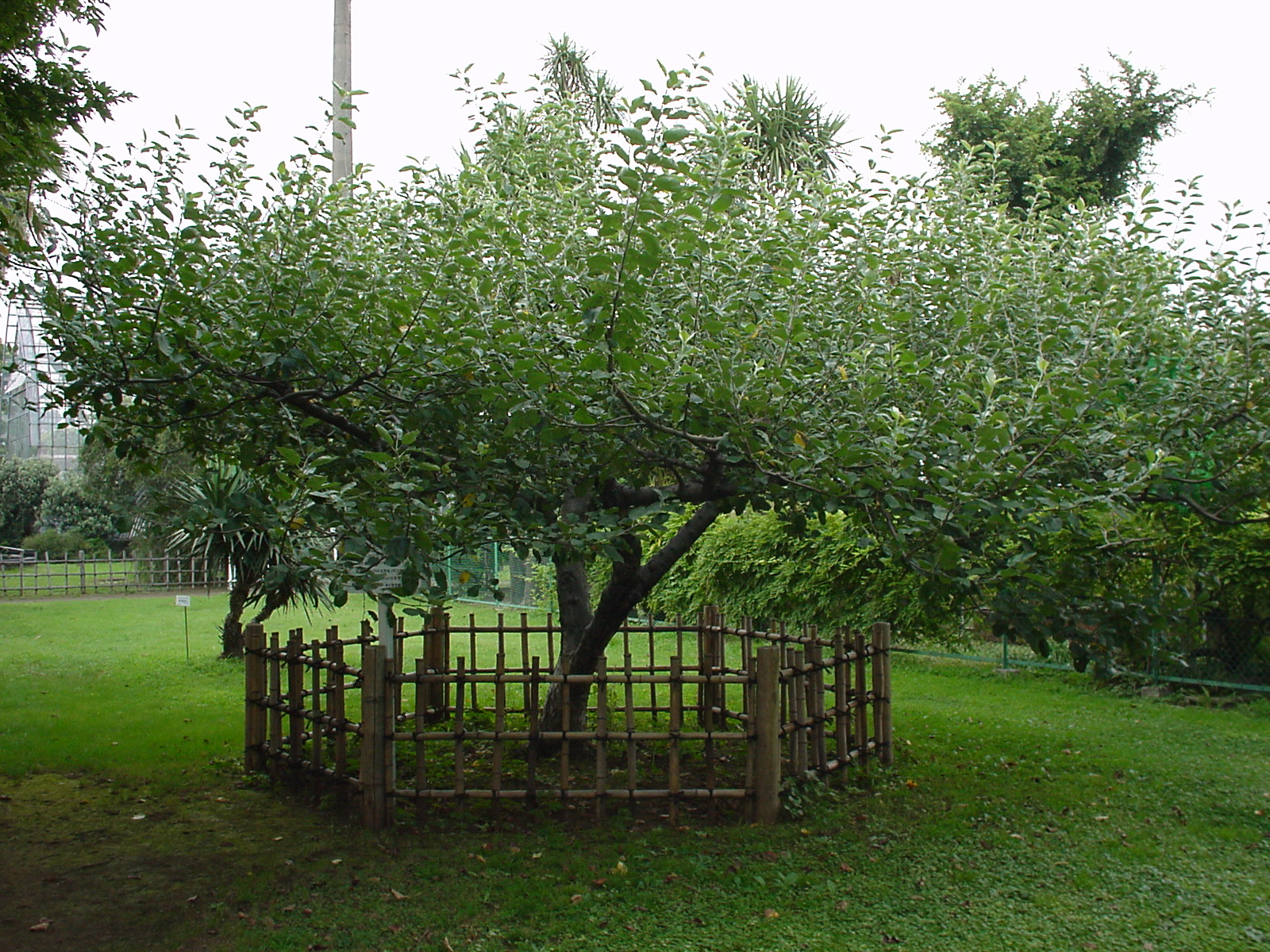
Newton's reflections that led him to his theories about gravity started when he saw an apple fall from a tree

In his book, Roberts recounts Sir Isaac Newton's discovery of gravity (using Newton's own descriptions and notes). Newton was sitting in his yard when he noticed an apple fall from a tree. The apple fell straight down, perpendicular to the ground, and Newton found himself wondering why the apple never falls upward or off to a side. Newton soon realized that it was a property of all matter to have an attractive force, including the apple, and even the moon –which moves as one would expect if it was passing the earth but nevertheless being attracted. It was another 20 years before Newton published his detailed theory of gravity, but he later visited the tree that helped him provoke the idea. Gaughan elaborates that Newton only had the opportunity to reflect on his orchard because of other chance circumstances: Newton was home because his university was shut down due to an outbreak of plague.

=== Nobel and blasting gelatin ===
According to Roberts, the common story that Alfred Nobel's discovery of dynamite was an accident may not be true. On the other hand, Roberts says, Nobel did make a discovery with the help of luck soon after that. Nobel cut his finger on a piece of glass one day at work and subsequently applied collodion in order to form a protective layer over the wound (similar in principle to liquid bandage). Nobel was kept up at night by the pain in his finger, so he started to think about a problem he was having back at work: Nobel was trying to create a powerful explosive using nitrocellulose and nitroglycerine, but the two would not combine. Roberts reports that Nobel then realized that collodion (which he was using to dress his wound) could allow the two substances to combine, which led to the invention of blasting gelatin (as powerful as dynamite but much safer to handle).

=== Pasteur ===
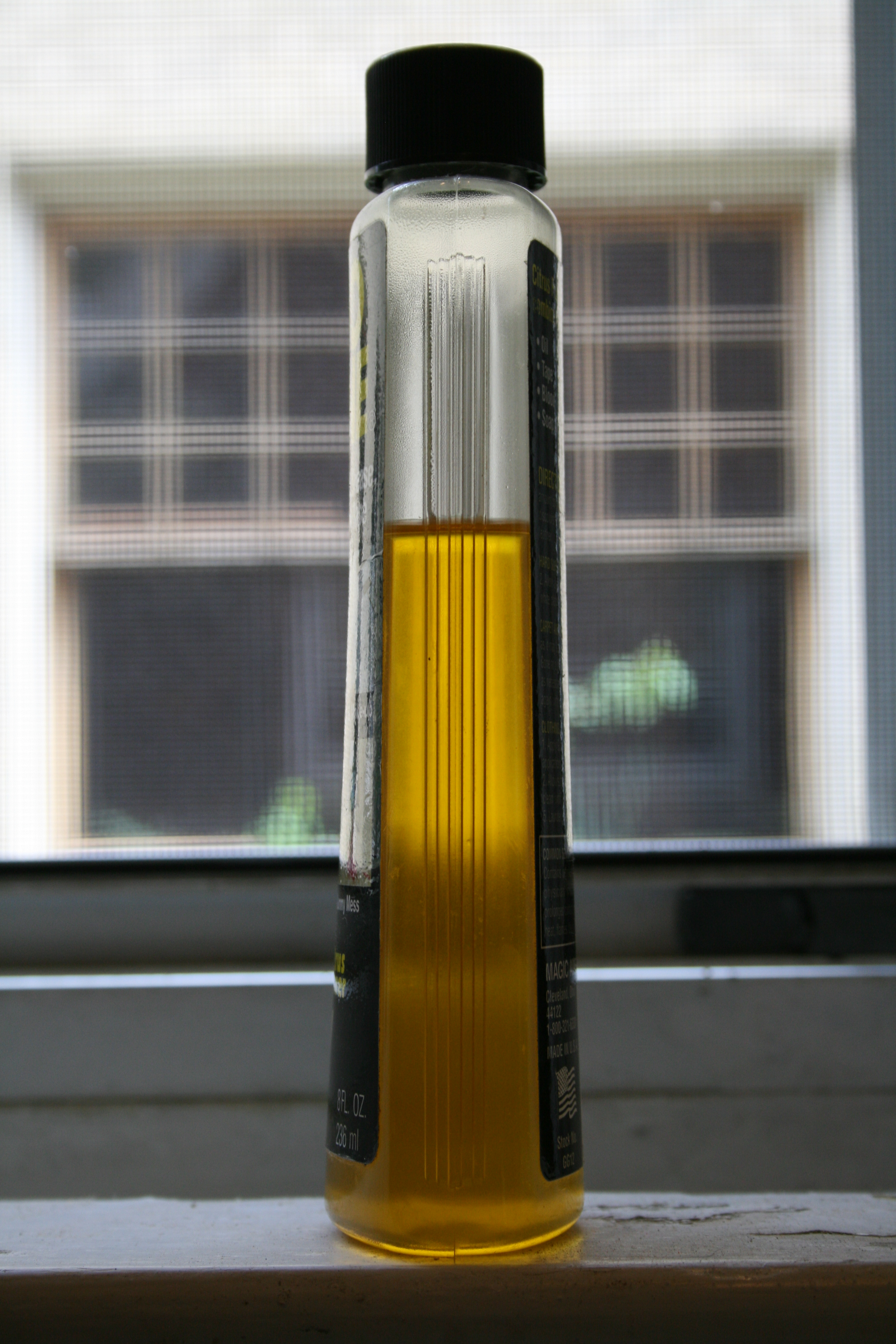
Pasteur was lucky to be using a particular kind of acid salt, but also lucky that he left his solution on a window sill overnight. Otherwise there would have been no chemical reaction, and his genius would have had nothing to notice and interpret.

The French scientist Louis Pasteur is responsible for various discoveries, some of which involved serendipity in some way. This seems to be the case with both his discovery that chemically identical molecules can have chirality (the way a right handed baseball glove will not work with the left hand), as well as his discovery of the chicken cholera vaccine.

==== Chirality ====
Roberts writes "Pasteur was puzzled: the salts of tartaric acid and racemic acid were said to be identical in chemical composition and crystalline shape, but they had different effects on polarized light." Pasteur later prepared a solution of only racemic acid and found that it itself contained salt crystals with chirality and which affected light differently. This was somewhat lucky because the type of salt crystals that Pasteur was studying (sodium ammonium salt of racemic acid) is one of few salts that would be visibly different in Pasteur's time. Moreover, the salts only differentiate if the solution reaches a temperature below 26 °C (79 °F); Pasteur did not know about this temperature requirement, but he did happen to store the solution on a window sill over night and the cold Paris air activated it.

==== Chicken cholera vaccine ====
Pasteur and his assistants had succeeded in isolating a microbe from chickens sick or dead from cholera. Chickens injected with the isolated microbe invariably died –a key element in Pasteur's reasoning that the microbe was responsible for the disease, rather than a result of the disease, as many thought. Pasteur was searching for a method of preventing the disease, but no matter what he did to the "broth" of microbes or to the chickens, all injected chickens died. Gaughan writes "Finally Pasteur had had enough, he needed a vacation. He told [his assistant] to take care of injecting more chickens with the next batch of bacteria." His assistant neglected the task, electing to go on vacation as well. When the men returned and injected chickens with the batch of bacteria that had sat around for a few weeks, none died, indicating to Pasteur that the batch of bacteria had been ruined. But when those same chickens were injected with a new batch of bacteria, none of them died, while chickens that hadn't previously been injected with the "spoiled" batch all died. Pasteur reasoned that the "attenuated" microbes in the spoiled batch "'used up' something within the body; something that wasn't there for the fully functional bacteria to eat." His explanation was wrong, but his chance creation of attenuated bacteria resulted in the first intentionally created vaccine.
