= Loab =

Fictional character created by text-to-image models

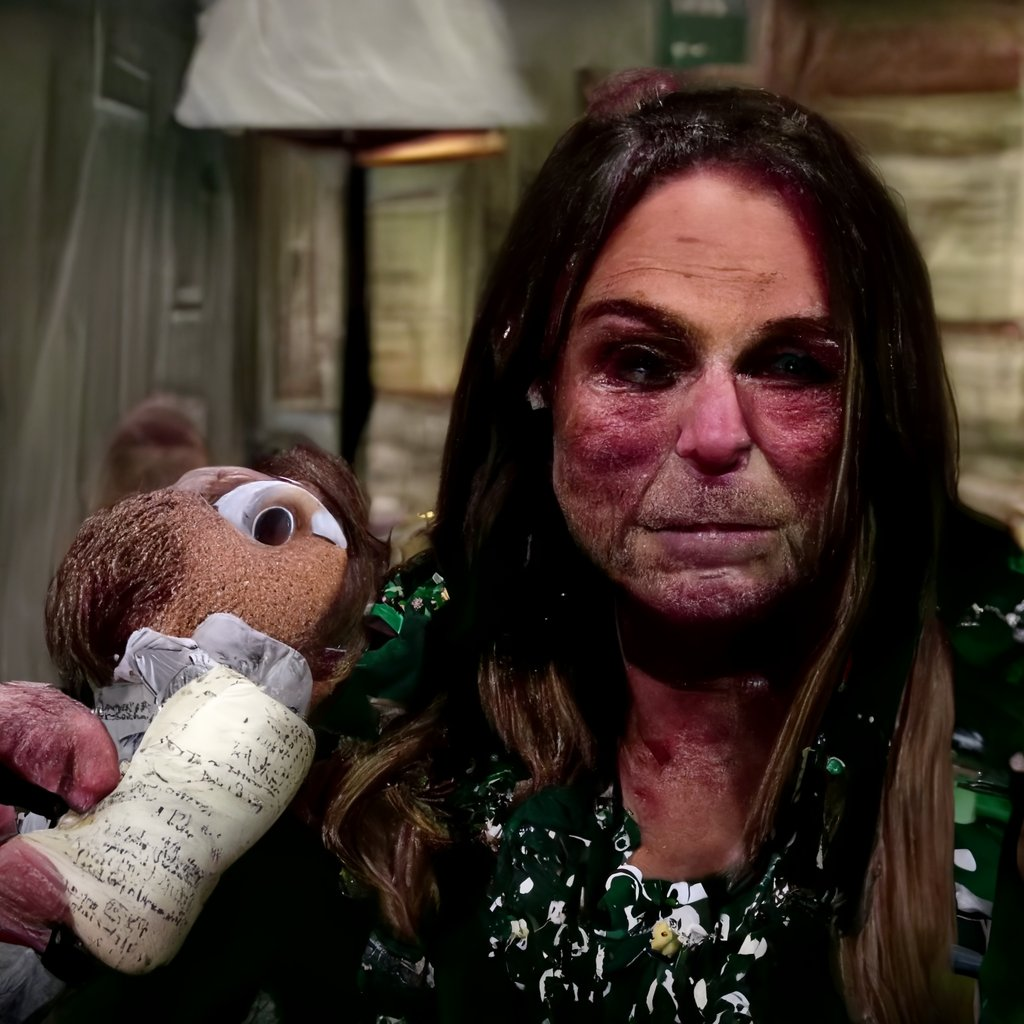
The first image of Loab presented by Swanson on Twitter

Loab (/ˈloʊb/ LOBE) is a fictional character that artist and writer Steph Maj Swanson claimed to have discovered with a text-to-image AI model in April 2022. In a viral Twitter thread, Swanson described the images of Loab as an unexpectedly emergent property of the software, saying they discovered them when asking the model to produce something "as different from the prompt as possible".

== History ==
The Sweden-based artist Steph Maj Swanson said that they first generated these images in April 2022 by using the algorithmic technique of "negative prompt weights" accessing latent space. The initial prompt - 'Brando::-1', requesting the opposite of actor Marlon Brando - generated a "skyline logo" with the cryptic lettering "DIGITA PNTICS". Attempting to generate the opposite of this image using the prompt "DIGITA PNTICS skyline logo::-1" yielded what Swanson described as "off-putting images, all of the same devastated-looking older woman with defined triangles of rosacea(?) on her cheeks". Swanson nicknamed the character "Loab", after one of the generated images resembled an album cover that included the printed word "loab".

Swanson says that using the image as a prompt for further images produced increasingly violent and gory results. Swanson speculated that something about the image could be "adjacent to extremely gory and macabre imagery in the distribution of the AI's world knowledge". Swanson says that when they combined images of Loab with other pictures, the subsequent results consistently return an image including Loab, regardless of how much distortion they added to the prompts to try and remove her visage. Swanson speculated that the latent space region of the AI map that Loab is located in, in addition to being near gruesome imagery, must be isolated enough that any combinations with other images could only use Loab from her area and no related images due to its isolation. After enough crossbreeding of images and dilution attempts, Swanson was able to eventually generate images without Loab, but found that crossbreeding those diluted images would also eventually lead to a version of Loab to reappear in the resulting images.

Swanson has said that "for various reasons" they declined to disclose the software used to create the images. Loab has been referred to as the "first AI-generated cryptid" and as such has gone viral. Despite hyping up the cryptid nature of the discovery in their wording, Swanson admitted that "Loab isn't really haunted, of course", but noted that the mythos that has sprung up around the AI-generated character has gone beyond their initial involvement. Swanson speculated that people sharing pictures and memes of Loab would lead future AIs to use those images as a part of their latent space maps, making her an innate part of the internet landscape, with Swanson adding "If we want to get rid of her, it's already too late."

== Response ==
There has been discussion of whether the Loab series of images are "a legitimate quirk of AI art software, or a cleverly disguised creepypasta." Smithsonian magazine has written that "Loab sparked some lengthy ethical conversations around visual aesthetics, art and technology," and some have criticized the labeling of a woman with rosacea as a horror image, considering this to be "stigmatizing disability". Swanson responded that if the AI map is combining Loab with violent imagery, then that is a "social bias" in the data being used for the image modeling software. The Atlantic writer Stephen Marche described Loab as a "form of expression that has never existed before" whose authorship is unclear and that exists as an "emanation of the collective imagistic heritage, the unconscious visual mind". Laurens Verhagen in de Volkskrant commented that rather than showing that there are "dark horror creatures hidden deep within AI", the existence of Loab instead implies that our current "understanding of AI is limited".

Mhairi Aitken at the Alan Turing Institute stated that rather than a "creepy" emergent property, output results like Loab were representative of the "limitations of AI image-generator models" and was more concerned about the urban legends that are born from such "boring" innocuous things and how easily "other people take these things seriously". Carly Cassella for ScienceAlert described Loab as a "modern day tronie" (a style of Dutch painting) that is not representative of an actual person, but just a concept or idea, similar but distinct from works like the Girl With A Pearl Earring. Wired's Joel Warner argued that Loab was only the beginning and that, with AI text generators such as ChatGPT becoming more commonplace, a "linguistic version of Loab" would emerge in that space as well and begin creating ideas through "intentional prompts" or otherwise that will be as disturbing as The 120 Days of Sodom.

== See also ==
- Artificial intelligence art
- Contrastive Language-Image Pre-training (CLIP), an image recognition artificial intelligence system
- Flashed face distortion effect, another serendipitous visual phenomenon
- Crungus, another AI-generated cryptid
