= Neuroscience and race =

Neurological study

A neurological look at race is multifaceted. The cross-race effect has been neurologically explained by there being differences in brain processing while viewing same-race and other-race faces. There is a debate over the cause of the cross-race effect.

== Techniques ==
Neurotechnology enables studying the brain and racial interactions, though this study can be difficult because these interactions can be hard to replicate. Face recognition tests are the most commonly used method in studying racial interactions. These tests consist of observing own-race and other-race faces, and studying the brain's response to the faces. There are three major neurological techniques used to measure the brain's response to these simulated racial interactions. Functional magnetic resonance imaging (fMRI) measures the brain activity through measuring the blood oxygen level in the brain. This test gives insight into which regions of the brain are active during a certain event. Event-related potentials (ERPs) measure the brain's activity through measuring electrical impulses by electrodes on the head. This test gives insight in rapid changes in the brain. Transcranial magnetic stimulation (TMS) measures the response of a region of the brain once activated through magnetism. This test gives insight into the causality of occurrences and gives specific insight in what the brain regions are doing. Brain-damaged patients have also been used to study racial interactions, by studying how racial interactions are affected when specific brain regions are damaged. These studies give insight into how different brain regions are involved in racial interactions once certain regions have been damaged. An implicit association test (IAC) is often used to measure the racial bias of people in studies by testing what objects, whether positive or negative, people associate with same-race or other-race faces.

== Cross-race effect ==
Many studies researching racial interactions analyze the cross-race effect. This is a bias or tendency for people to be more familiar with a face of the same race compared to members of another race. This is characterized by people performing poorly on face recognition tests with other-race faces. This phenomenon is rooted in differences in face recognition and memory processing of same-race and other race faces.

=== Facial recognition ===
The first step the brain does to encode a memory is to process the face. The lateral fusiform gyrus is a facial recognition area of the brain. Within this brain region, the fusiform face area (FFA) analyzes the configuration and holistic appearance of the face. The FFA is more activated when viewing same-race faces compared to other-race faces. As time progresses from when the face is first viewed, the differences in FFA activation diminish. It’s believed that the FFA is more activated when viewing a same-race face because the brain individuates (using more analytic power) the same-race faces while simply categorizing other-race faces. The FFA isn’t the only region involved in facial recognition that effects the cross-race effect, but also the whole ventral temporal cortex (VT cortex). Scientists are able to distinguish which race face one is viewing at simply by viewing the VT cortex. Additionally, the fusiform cortex plays a vital role in categorizing race faces. This section is also more activated when viewing same-race faces, as it is studying the face in greater detail. However, these differences in activation of the fusiform complex diminish when a familiar other-race face is shown, like a celebrity.

=== Memory ===
Top-down and bottom-up processing are terms used to describe the differences in memory processing when observing same-race and other-race faces. Bottom-up processing puts together pieces of a whole and develops one grand picture. Top-down processing uses more initial cognitive work by breaking down the whole picture into pieces, and then analyzing those pieces. Bottom-up processing is used in processing same-race faces, and requires much less brain activation than top-down processing, which is used while processing other-race faces. When bottom-up brain processing is used while viewing same-race faces, a holistic face in perceived, encoded and remembered. When top-down brain processing is used while viewing other-race faces, only features of the face are perceived and encoded. Once the face is perceived by the VT cortex, the hippocampus is used to encode the memory in the parietal lobe. Overall, same-race faces undergo better memory encoding processes than other-race faces because they are remembered more often, however, other-race faces that are remembered undergo a more effortful memory encoding process. More brain activation is needed to effectively encode an other-race face. Memory encoding isn't the only found cause of the cross-race effect; memory retrieval is also involved. In retrieving a memory, the parietal lobe is reactivated. When retrieving an other-race face, there is more reactivation of the parietal lobe, meaning more effort is needed to retrieve an other-race face memory. The frontal lobe is also activated while observing other-race faces if the parietal lobe is unable to retrieve the memory, acting as a search engine in the brain looking for the location of the memory.

=== Theories of origin ===
There are two main theories that attempt to explain the origin of the cross-race effect: the perceptual expertise hypothesis and the social cognitive hypothesis. The perceptual expertise hypothesis states that the cross-race effect is due to lack of exposure to other cultures and is not hard-wired. Strong evidence for this hypothesis is a decreasing cross-race effect in immigrants that have assimilated to a culture for a few years. Another finding in support of this hypothesis is the reversibility of the cross-race effect in ethnic adopted children. The social cognitive hypothesis states that the cross-race effect is a result of a participants' internal beliefs and prejudices acting on the face processing and memory functions of the brain. Evidence for this hypothesis is a higher activation of the amygdala and other areas of the brain involved with attitudes and evaluations when first viewing an other-race face. The categorization-individualization model, which is a newer theory, states that the cross-race effect is due to the merging of social categorization, motivated individuation, and perceptual experience. There’s very convincing evidence that all of these factors play a role in the cross-race effect.

=== Amygdala ===
The amygdala, which is the most researched brain region in racism studies, shows much greater activation while viewing other-race faces than same-race faces. This region of the brain is associated with fear conditioning, and has many connections with the cortex to control the body’s emotional response. Often, there is variation in amygdala activation due to motivation and goals. The amygdala’s activation can be changed through not focusing on race or focusing on removing the racial bias. Scientists believe that amygdala activation differences arise due to social/cultural perceptions and individual experiences. However, patients with a damaged amygdala still show a racial bias, meaning that the amygdala isn’t the only region involved in activating a racial bias. The link between the amygdala and racial prejudice has been comprehensively reviewed.

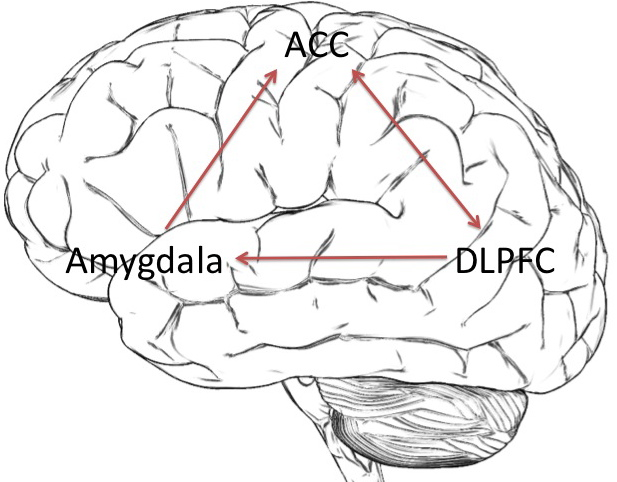
Collaboration of brain areas in responding to other-race faces. Amygdala signals to the ACC. The ACC and DLPFC communicate with each other. The DLPFC controls the amygdala.

=== Anterior cingulate cortex ===
The anterior cingulate cortex (ACC) is associated with detecting conflict and determining how to resolve that conflict. It is believed to play a part in the controversy in one’s mind over personal racial biases and cultural equality norms. ACC activation increases when a person has an automatic negative response to an out-group member, as shown in amygdala activation. The ACC is used to recognize the conflict between cultural expectations and the automatic negative response, and is the first step in expressing racial attitudes.

=== Dorsolateral prefrontal cortex ===
The dorsolateral prefrontal cortex (DLPFC) works in conjunction with the ACC, and acts as the overseer of the reaction to the racial conflict. It is the main region activated in top-down processing. The DLPFC controls the emotional response through interactions with the amygdala connected through the ventromedial prefrontal cortex. The DLPFC suppresses the amygdala activity to lower the initial racial bias and resolve the conflict. Suppression of the DLPFC through TMS techniques has made the patients increase their expression of racial bias. The DLPFC function is determined by internal beliefs and awareness of societal attitudes.

== Corrections ==
Though there is an innate initial negative response while viewing other-race faces, the brain regions that control this response are malleable. The ACC and DLPFC both regulate the amygdala’s initial negative response. Many studies show that the initial racial bias can be changed through different situational contexts and motivations. Differences in amygdala activation have diminished when other-race faces of famous or respected people are viewed, showing that amygdala activation can be controlled through personal beliefs. Also, increased exposure to other races and cultural ideals help suppress the racial bias within the brain circuitry. For instance, one study showed that Asian immigrants who lived in America for an extended time showed an absence of the cross-race effect to other American faces, implying that exposure to other races decreases the effects of the cross-race effect. Current studies in positive psychology have shown that denial of racial differences leads only to further racial stereotyping. Therefore, the best way to control racism is to acknowledge racial differences, and to accept racial equality. Emotional regulation techniques are needed to overcome some racist beliefs, which involves emotionally reinterpreting events. Behavior enhancer drugs could possibly be used in the future to modify people's racist response, but there are ethical arguments against this.

== Anatomical differences ==
There has been limited research on actual neurological differences among ethnic groups. This is believed to be due to low participation in experiments by minority groups. However, some research has shown some differences in brain anatomy among ethnic groups. The causes are discussed in the context of sampling difficulties, racism, socioeconomic status, and differences in health outcomes. There have been observed morphological differences between European American and Chinese individuals in the frontal, parietal, and temporal brain regions. These differences are thought to be due to the effects of language differences on brain development. A 2010 study on variability in frontotemporal brain structure between African Americans and European Americans found differences in brain structure, despite the participants all being from an English speaking nation. However, these differences were small in nature, and most failed to survive a Bonferroni correction. The results can only be considered preliminary, as it only had 25 African American participants, and did not account for any confounds like health or socioeconomic status.
