= Affect as information hypothesis =

Cognitive psychology concept

In cognitive psychology, the affect-as-information hypothesis, or 'approach', is a model of evaluative processing, postulating that affective feelings provide a source of information about objects, tasks, and decision alternatives. A goal of this approach is to understand the extent of influence that affect has on cognitive functioning. It has been proposed that affect has two major dimensions, namely affective valence and affective arousal, and in this way is an embodied source of information. Affect is thought to impact three main cognitive functions: judgement, thought processing, and memory. In a variety of scenarios, the influence of affect on these processes is thought to be mediated by its effects on attention. The approach is thought to account for a wide variety of behavioural phenomena in psychology.

== Informative functions of affect: reaction vs. arousal ==
The affect as information hypothesis emphasises significance of the information that affect communicates, rather than the affective feelings themselves. Affective reactions or 'responses' provide an embodied source of information about 'value' or valence, as well as affective arousal provides an embodied source of information about importance. More specifically, affective reactions are pleasant or unpleasant reactions that provide information on positive ('good') and negative ('bad') value, respectively. Objects, task situations, and other stimuli or targets- if experienced as the source of an affective reaction- take on the positive or negative affect value. Affective arousal involves implicit (stress hormonal response such as from the adrenergic system) or explicit responses (subjective experience) that provide information on relevance, urgency, or importance. Both dimensions are thought to affect cognitive functioning through influencing judgements and decision making, processing, and memory, and in a variety of situations this is thought to be mediated through its influences on attention.

== Affect on judgement and decision making ==
=== Affective reaction ===
A finding by Schwarz and Clore (1988) has been noted in literature (for example,), wherein individuals are thought to review and attend to their affective reactions when making evaluative judgements and decisions. They typically ask themselves, "How do I feel about it". A broad example of this (which may be applied to a variety of situations) is when considering how much we like something. Our judgements are based on how we feel about a particular stimulus as opposed to the attributes or characteristics of the said stimulus. Essentially, if the object, task situation, or other stimulus is experienced as the source of an affective reaction and takes on the affect value, then a judgement or decision may be made about the stimulus based on these attributed feelings. Positive and negative affect typically lead to positive and negative judgements, respectively.

=== Affective arousal ===
Affective arousal is thought to intensify positive and negative affective reactions and, as a result, judgemental evaluations- as if relying on affective arousal to indicate how strongly one feels about something. An empirical example of this is findings of intensified evaluations under high affective arousal when watching advertisements. Advertisements with positive and negative affective tone were evaluated as more positive and negative respectively, under conditions of high affective arousal relative to under conditions of low affective arousal.

=== Attribution of affect ===
Affect may be elicited by the stimulus or situation of relevance, which is referred to as integral affect. Conversely, affect may be momentary and coincide in time with the presence of the relevant stimulus, but be unrelated to the stimulus. This is referred to as incidental affect. Integral affect provides meaningful, relevant information about a target stimulus on which a judgement or decision can be made. Incidental affect may lead to affective feelings being subsequently mis-attributed to the stimulus at hand and thus provide mistaken information about the stimulus, from which a mislead judgement or decision is formed.

=== Research examples ===
There is a variety of research investigating the influence of affect on judgement, and the misattribution of affect. One study in the area investigated affective valence. They induced positive and negative affective states based on a life event (happy versus sad), and the weather (sunny versus rainy). Induced positive affective states (good experiences, sunny weather) lead to more positive evaluations of ratings of general well-being, relative to in an induced negative affective state (sad experiences, rainy weather), which lead to more negative life evaluations. They also found that negative life evaluations from an induced negative affective state was removed when the state was induced to be attributed to an irrelevant source (not to life satisfaction). This misattribution did not occur when in an induced positive affective state. Their conclusion was that the results indicate that affective state indirectly influenced judgements of life satisfaction through the type of information conveyed by affective feelings associated with life satisfaction.

Another study in the area illustrates misattribution, and an effect of affective arousal on judgement. They induced high affective arousal in the experimental condition where participants had to cross a high bridge, and a low affective arousal state in the control condition where participants had to cross a low bridge. All participants were male, and met an attractive female demonstrator on the other side of the bridge. They found that participants in the induced high affective arousal condition contacted the attractive demonstrator after the experiment significantly more than those in the induced low affective arousal condition. Males with a high affective arousal state had amplified attraction to the woman, as they misattributed their feelings of arousal caused by the bridge, to feelings of affective arousal caused by the attractive woman.

== Affect on cognitive processing ==
Affect has been indicated to provide information about how benign versus problematic a situation or task is, which is dependent on the type of affective reaction or arousal. Consequently, this influences the type of information processing style that is used to interpret the situation.

=== Affective reaction ===
If the affect is attributed as a response to a situation or stimulus then positive affect signals a benign situation that promotes relational processing which involves primarily top down processing of information. Conversely, negative affect signals a problematic situation, inhibiting processing associated with positive affect and promoting referential processing which is associated primarily with bottom up processing.

==== Global vs. local processing ====
An example of the influence of affect on processing style is that of its influence on the use of a global versus a local focus. Positive affect is thought to induce a more global processing style (processing of wholes). Conversely, negative affect reduces global processing and enhances a more local processing style (processing of parts or details).

Other research in this area has illustrated that the informative influence of affective valence is dependent on the accessibility of these global and local processing styles. In situations when either a global or local style was more accessible, positive affect lead to a greater increase in global or local processing respectively, compared to negative affect.

==== Stereotypical thought processing ====
Affective valence has also been indicated to have informative effects on stereotypical thought processing. Positive affect is thought to lead to increased stereotypical thought processing, illustrated in research where participants in an induced positive mood were more likely than those in an induced neutral mood or negative mood to make a stereotypical judgement. This was suggested to be due to stereotypical thought elicited from the positive affect. Additionally, negative affect has been demonstrated to lead to decreased stereotypical thought processing.

=== Affective arousal ===
As in the effect of arousal in judgement, affective arousal is proposed to intensify cognitive processing that has been induced as a result of information provided by affective valence. An illustration is that empirical research on false memories showed with high affective arousal, more false memories were produced within different valence conditions (positive, negative, neutral) than with low affective arousal.

== Affect on memory ==
=== Affective reaction ===
Affective arousal has predominantly been discussed with regard to the informative influence of affect on memory. However, the influence of affective valence on memory has been demonstrated in research, such as at memory retrieval. It was illustrated that after exposure to pleasant or unpleasant odours to induce positive or negative affective valence respectively, those with induced positive affect provided significantly more positive ratings (rated as happy memory) of a retrieved memory than those with induced negative affect. Affective valence has also been implicated at memory encoding.

=== Affective arousal ===
Affective arousal has been indicated to influence memory as it redirects or narrows attention towards potentially important or salient factors such as environmental stimuli, thus influencing what information gets encoded in to memory. As mentioned, this effect is mediated by implicit and explicit affective arousal responses, indicative of the level of importance in a situation. Affective arousal has also been implicated in consolidation of long-term memory through the mediating effects of stress hormones of the adrenergic system as shown by functional connectivity between the amygdala and the hippocampus- whose functions include memory consolidation.

=== Research example ===
Empirical research investigating both affective valence and arousal found effects on different aspects of memory. In their research, they investigated the effect of induced positive versus negative affective valence, and induced high and low arousal on memory encoding using picture slides, in a delayed (to assess long-term memory) and immediate free-recall task. In both free recall conditions, high arousal at encoding lead to better memory performance than low arousal at encoding. A similar finding occurred for affective valence where positive affect at encoding lead to better memory performance, however only for the immediate free-recall condition. They concluded that their results indicate the influence of both dimensions of affect at encoding, and involvement of affective arousal in long-term memory.

== History ==
=== Development of the early theory ===
A researcher in the field of cognitive psychology by the name of Norbert Schwarz was interested in the informative function of feelings. He commenced research alongside Robert Wyer and Gerald Clore. Building off the ideas of earlier works, one he summarised was that current feelings elicited increase the availability of information congruent with that feeling. He recognised that these ideas were developed upon by the earlier researchers; Isen, Shalker, Clark, and Karp (1978), and Bower (1981), who were researching affect and cognitive functioning. Additionally, the influential idea in this field stemming from the work of Wyer and Carlston (1979) was that a function of affect is to provide information about a target. Their investigation into the functions of feelings gave further insight into the informative functions of feelings, from which they derived core postulates of their theory. Development of the theory and postulates derived are detailed and summarised in Schwarz's (2010) 'Feelings as information theory'.
