= Crungus =

Imaginary creature created by text-to-image models

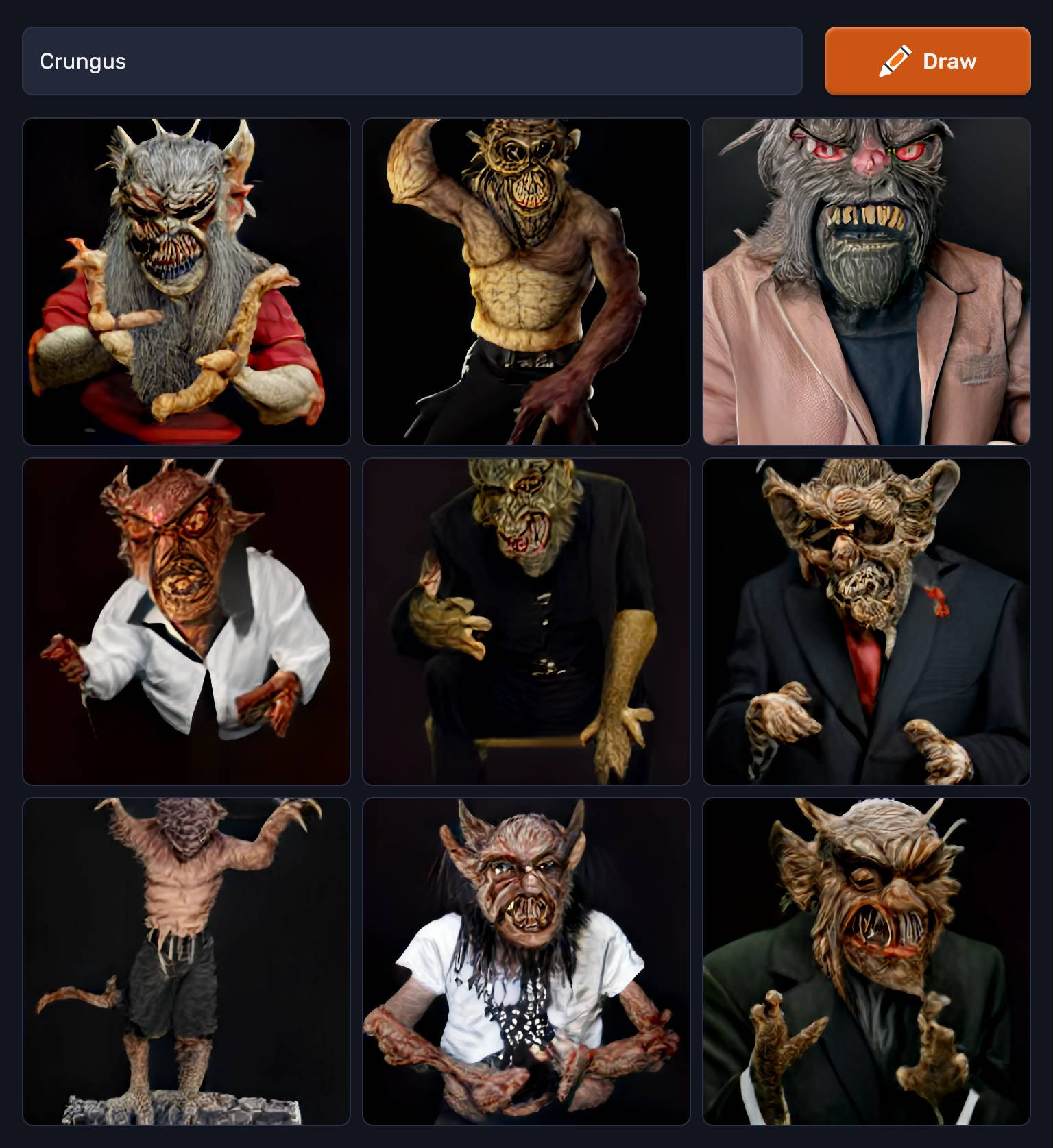
Responses to the "Crungus" prompt in the Craiyon app

A Crungus is an imaginary creature found in artificial intelligence text-to-image models, sometimes also referred to as a digital cryptid. Twitch streamer, voice actor, and comedian Guy Kelly found that typing the made-up word into the Craiyon image generator consistently produced pictures of a monstrous, hairy humanoid.

He later tweeted about this which resulted in a very long thread of reactions and experiments with "Crungus" and variations of this AI-prompt also on different engines.

Since Craiyon version 2 was introduced in 2023, the prompt "Crungus" no longer produces the same imaginary creature.

== Origins ==
It is unclear how the Crungus in Craiyon's output came into existence. Kelly thinks an error in the AI software models is the most likely explanation. In any case, the Krampus was quickly eliminated as a model. Although the horned mythical figure from the Alpine region has a similar name and his mask looks almost exactly the same, the term "Krampus" on Craiyon provides different images.

Kelly also speculated at the AI was responding to the "-rungus" suffix, noting the similar appearance of heavy metal performer Oderus Urungus, and could be interpreting the word as something "orc-based", in reference to the fantasy creatures.

== See also ==
- Artificial intelligence art
- Loab, another AI generated cryptid
