= Andy Young (psychologist) =

British psychologist

Andrew William Young is a British cognitive neuropsychologist whose primary research has been on face perception.

== Career ==
Young obtained a BSc (Psychology) from Bedford College, London in 1971 followed by a PhD from the University of Warwick in 1974. He initially worked as a Lecturer at the University of Aberdeen (1974-1976) and at the University of Lancaster (1976-1989). He then moved to the University of Durham as Professor (1989-1993) followed by four years at the MRC Applied Psychology Unit at the University of Cambridge. In 1997 he was appointed Professor of Neuropsychology at the University of York.

== Research ==
He has conducted research on aspects of face perception. This has included functional neuroimaging and studies of people with different types of brain injury and psychiatric conditions.

He has discussed his work at different forums.

He has been President of the Experimental Psychology Society and the Psychology Section of the British Association for the Advancement of Science.

== Awards ==
- 1995 – Presidents Award, British Psychological Society
- 2000 – Honorary doctorate, University of Liège
- 2001 – Fellow, British Academy
- 2004 – Academician/Fellow, Academy of Social Sciences
- 2005 – Honorary Fellow, British Psychological Society
- 2013 - Lifetime Achievement Award, British Psychological Society, (for Distinguished Contributions to Psychological Knowledge)

== Books ==
- Young, A. (2016). Facial Expression Recognition: The Selected Works of Andy Young (World Library of Psychologists).
- Bruce, V., & Young, A. (2011). Face Perception.
