= Global precedence =

Images and other stimuli contain both local features (details, parts) and global features (the whole). Precedence refers to the level of processing (global or local) to which attention is first directed. Global precedence occurs when an individual more readily identifies the global feature when presented with a stimulus containing both global and local features. The global aspect of an object embodies the larger, overall image as a whole, whereas the local aspect consists of the individual features that make up this larger whole. Global processing is the act of processing a visual stimulus holistically. Although global precedence is generally more prevalent than local precedence, local precedence also occurs under certain circumstances and for certain individuals. Global precedence is closely related to the Gestalt principles of grouping in that the global whole is a grouping of proximal and similar objects. Within global precedence, there is also the global interference effect, which occurs when an individual is directed to identify the local characteristic, and the global characteristic subsequently interferes by slowing the reaction time.

== Basic methods ==
Global precedence was first studied using the Navon figure, where many small letters are arranged to form a larger letter that either does or does not match. Variations of the original Navon figure include both shapes and objects. Individuals presented with a Navon figure will be given one of two tasks. In one type of task, participants are told before the presentation of the stimulus whether to focus on a global or local level, and their accuracy and reaction times are recorded.

Navon figures
Consistent

TTTTTTTTTTTT
TTTTTTTTTTTT
    TTTT
    TTTT
    TTTT
    TTTT
    TTTT
    TTTT

Neutral

++++++++++++
++++++++++++
    ++++
    ++++
    ++++
    ++++
    ++++
    ++++

Conflicting

SSSSSSSSSSSS
SSSSSSSSSSSS
    SSSS
    SSSS
    SSSS
    SSSS
    SSSS
    SSSS

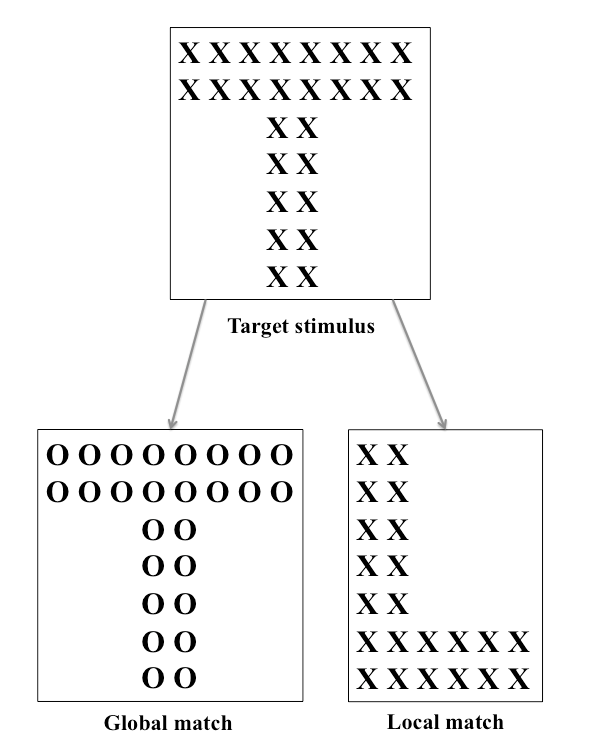

In another type of task, participants are first presented with a target stimulus, and later presented with two different visuals. One of the visuals matches the target stimulus on the global level, while the other visual matches the target stimulus on the local level. In this condition, experimenters note which of the two visuals, the global or local, is chosen to match the target stimulus.

== Specific results and theories ==
=== Navon's original study ===
In general, reaction time for identifying the larger letter is faster than for the smaller letters that make up the shape. Navon directed participants to focus either globally or locally to stimuli that were consistent, neutral, or conflicting on the global and local levels (see figures above). Reaction time for global identification was much faster than for local identification, showing global precedence. Additionally, global interference effect, which occurs when the global aspect is automatically processed even when attention is directed locally, causes slow reaction time. Navon's study global precedence and his stimuli, or variations of it, are still used in nearly all global precedence experiments.

=== Racial differences ===
When presented with a Navon figure, there is a slight local preference for Caucasians, but East Asians show an obvious global preference and are faster and more accurate at global processing. The inclination towards global precedence is also evident in second generation Asian-Australians, but the correlation is weaker than that of recent immigrants. This could stem from the physical environment of East Asian versus Western cities, as the level of visual complexity varies across these environments. The tendency of Caucasians to process information "analytically" and Asians "holistically" has also been attributed to differences in brain structure.

For some cognitive scientists, the stark contrast in cognitive processing trends across cultures and races suggests that all studies on cognitive perception should report participants’ races to ensure valid theoretical conclusions. Especially in experiments involving spatially distributed stimuli, neglected racial or cultural differences in visual perception could skew results.

=== Cultural differences ===
Global precedence is not a universal phenomenon.

When Navon figure stimuli are presented to participants from a remote African culture, the Himba, local precedence is observed although the Himba show the capabilities for both global and local processing.

This difference in precedence for Navon figure stimuli can be attributed to cultural differences in occupations, or in the practice of reading and writing. This finding dispels the idea that local precedence is a consequence or symptom of disorders, since the Himba is a normally functioning society capable of both global and local processing.

=== Varying stimuli ===
Stimuli are either meaningful or meaningless. For example, letters and familiar objects, like a cup, are meaningful, while unidentifiable and non-geometric forms are not. In both types of stimuli, the global advantage is observed, but the global interference effect only occurs with meaningful stimuli. In other words, when the global object is meaningful, the reaction time for identification of the local feature increases.

This supports the theory that within global precedence, global advantage and global interference rely on two separate mechanisms. Global-local interference occurs as a result of automatic processing of global objects. The theory is that the global precedence effect has a sensory mechanism active in global advantage, whereas automatic and semantic processes are active in the interference effect.

=== Age ===
Cognitive processing varies across different age groups, and several studies have been done using Navon-like figures to examine the correlation between precedence and age.

==== Children and Adolescents ====
When presented with a global-local task, children and adolescents exemplify a local bias. Younger children respond slower to different types of stimuli compared to older children, and thus local precedence seems more prevalent than global precedence in perceptual organization, at least until adolescence, when the transition to globally oriented visual perception begins. The ability to encode a global shape, which is necessary for efficiently recognizing and identifying objects, increases with age. However, it has also been found that there is a bias towards global information during infancy, which may be based upon high spatial frequency information, as well as limited vision. Therefore, global precedence during the early years of life may not be upwards but rather a U-shaped development.

==== Aging ====
There is a decline of global precedence in older subjects. When presented with a Navon-like figure, young adults demonstrate global precedence enhancement in that when the number of local letters forming the global letter increases, their global precedence increases. On the other hand, there is no precedence effect or enhancement for older subjects when presented with the same task. This links global precedence to the Gestalt principles of Proximity and Continuity, and suggests that Gestalt-related deficiencies, such as decline in perceptual grouping, may underlie the decline of global precedence in older subjects.

Global precedence decline may also relate to hemispheric specialization. The spatial frequency theory proposes that global versus local information is processed through two “channels” of low (global) versus high (local) spatial frequencies. spatial frequency measures how often a stimulus moves through space. Based upon this theory, the double frequency theory links the left hemisphere with high spatial frequencies, leading to a global precedence effect, and the right hemisphere with low spatial frequencies, leading to a local precedence effect. This suggests neuropsychological factors behind global precedence decline in there may be faster aging in the right than the left hemisphere.

=== Affect ===
Studies regarding mood have shown that positive and negative cues can influence global versus local attention during image-based tasks.

==== Self-generated emotional primes ====
Some studies have shown that positive priming decreases local response time, demonstrating a lessening effect of global precedence, while negative priming increases local response time. Mood dictates one's preferences for processing type.

The result that negative priming reduces flexibility correlates to the Psi theory states that negative emotion inhibits one’s access to extension memory, reducing cognitive flexibility. This also supports the theory that positive affect increases cognitive flexibility.

==== Standardized emotional primes ====
Positive mood priming also increases cognitive flexibility when prime words do not have individualistic specificity and when primes are visual. Positive affect does not simply promote local processing, but rather improves one’s abilities in his non-preferred dimension. For example, one preferring the local aspect of stimuli would show increased performance in identifying the global aspect and vice versa. This further supports the cognitive flexibility theory.

However, many studies regarding global processing and affect conflict with each other. One particular study showed that individuals in happy moods are more likely than those in sad moods to identify images based on global attributes rather than local ones, contrary to other studies that have been conducted. Paying attention to global features is the standard strategy for visual processing. Therefore, if positive feelings are more frequent than negative feelings, and thus positive feelings are more accessible, then positive feelings should instigate global processing more than negative feelings because the global strategy is similarly more accessible. From a more worldly application, positive affect might aid in understanding the larger meaning of stimuli like literature or art, whereas negative affect might aid understanding more minute details within those stimuli, like particularly rhythmic words or the nuance of colors.

=== Faces ===
==== Navon bias ====
Priming with Navon figures aides the recognition of faces, a holistic task, when the response elicited from the figure matches the precedence of the figure. For example, if the stimulus has local precedence and the participant is cued to respond with the local feature identification, his accuracy in facial recognition improves. The same occurs when global responses are asked of global stimuli.

When a facial task requires local processing for identification, participants’ facial recognition improves when they must respond to global precedence stimuli with local responses and vice versa. They are forced to show cognitive flexibility in their responses to the Navon figure primes.

One theory explains that normal facial recognition requires automatic processes, whereas special facial recognition requires controlled processes. Automatic processes are aided by correlative stimuli and responses, while controlled processes are aided by stimuli and responses that do not correlate. This indicates that facial recognition depends on type of attention, automatic or controlled, rather than focus on global or local features.

==== Face inversion ====
When identifying inverted faces, those showing stronger global precedence show a more prominent face inversion effect. Those showing a stronger global precedence also have a greater deficit in identification abilities when the faces are inverted; their identification abilities decrease more from upright identification to inverted identification than weak global precedence individuals.

This correlates to the theory that upright faces are processed holistically, or with a special mechanism. Those with stronger global precedence should perform better at holistically processing a face upright. Stronger global precedence should show a greater decrease in accuracy of identification of inverted faces because the task relies on local processing.

=== Individual characteristics ===
The degree of global precedence one demonstrates has been found to differ in relation to the variable of an individual's field dependence. Field dependency is the amount that one relies on Gestalt laws of perceptual organization. High field dependency corresponds to a greater bias toward the global level, while field independence corresponds to a lesser dependency on the global level.

This indicates that individual characteristics have an effect on the prevalence of global precedence and that global and local processing exist on a continuum.

=== Physiological explanation ===
Neuropsychological evidence based on PET scans suggests that the global aspect of visual situations activates and is processed preferentially by the right hemisphere, whereas the local aspect of visual situations activates and is processed preferentially by the left hemisphere. The classical view of Gestalt psychology also suggests the right hemisphere is involved in the perception of wholes and thus plays a stronger role in global processing, whereas the left hemisphere involves separate local elements and therefore plays a stronger role in local processing.

However, hemispheric specialization is relative because it depends on the experimental setting as well as the individual’s “attentional set.” In addition, stimulus type may influence the neural structures underlying hemispheric specialization. Global processing is the default strategy for most individuals, but local stimuli are often more perceptually demanding to recognize and identify, showing the effect of stimuli on visual processing.

== Disorders ==
The Navon figure has been used in relating theories regarding processing to assessing cognitive learning disabilities, such as developmental dyslexia, dyscalculia, obsessive-compulsive personality disorder, and autism.

=== Dyslexia ===
When given a Navon figure test, people with dyslexia have difficulty automatically identifying graphemes with phonemes, but not with identifying numbers with magnitudes. On the other hand, people with dyscalculia have difficulty automatically identifying numbers with magnitudes, but not letters and with phonemes. This suggests a dissociation between subjects with dyslexia and dyscalculia. These developmental learning disabilities do not cause general problems with identifying symbols to their mental representations, but rather create specific challenges.

=== Obsessive compulsive personality disorder ===
Obsessive-compulsive personality disorder (OCPD) subjects are prone to be distracted by the local aspects of stimuli when asked to identify global aspects of figures such as the Navon figure. This is likely because individuals with OCPD characteristically have sharp, detail-oriented attentions, and tend to focus more on specifics rather than the larger context.

=== Autism ===
There are correlations between global or local performance on a task and the abilities to identify emotion and canine age for autistic children. In both cases, global responses correlate to better identification. In general, autistic children demonstrate much weaker global precedence than those without the disorder. Within the group of autistic children, those who respond more globally to a discrimination task perform better on emotion and canine age tasks.

One explanation is a possible biological dysfunction in the brain region where facial processing occurs. Research indicates that global processing, facial recognition, and emotional expression recognition are all linked to the right hemisphere. A defect in that area would explain the characteristics of autism. For further information on facial recognition and processing in individuals with autism see the autism and facial recognition section of face perception.
