= Cross-race effect =

Cognitive bias on facial recognition

The cross-race effect (sometimes called cross-race bias, other-race bias, own-race bias or other-race effect) is the tendency to more easily recognize faces that belong to one's own racial group, or racial groups that one has been in contact with. In social psychology, the cross-race effect is described as the "ingroup advantage," whereas in other fields, the effect can be seen as a specific form of the "ingroup advantage" since it is only applied in interracial or inter-ethnic situations. The cross-race effect is thought to contribute to difficulties in cross-race identification, as well as implicit racial bias.

A number of theories as to why the cross-race effect exists have been conceived, including social cognition and perceptual expertise. However, no model has been able to fully account for the full body of evidence.

== History ==
The first research study on the cross-race effect was published in 1914. It stated that humans tend to perceive people of other races than themselves to all look alike. All else being equal, individuals of a given race are distinguishable from each other in proportion to their familiarity or contact with the race as a whole. This does not hold true when people of different races familiarize themselves with races different from their own.

As research into the cross-race effect continued, multiple theories arose as to why the effect exists, including the contact hypothesis, different processing mechanisms, social cognition, feature selection, and cognitive disregard. However, each of these theories have their own challenges and conflicting evidence.

Numerous studies on the cross-race effect have occurred. However, improvements in technology has allowed for researchers to study the cross-race effect from a neural and/or computational lens. Despite both occurring under the umbrella of facial processing, researchers have found that different areas of the brain (such as the fusiform face area) activate when processing own-race vs other-race faces. Research using computational models have found that the other race effect only occurs when facial processing and feature selection is influenced by biased experience. However, as use of these methods to examine the cross-race effect is relatively new, further research is still needed.

== Theoretical approaches ==
=== Ingroup advantage ===
Cross-race effect has a strong connection with the ingroup advantage phenomenon. With ingroup advantage, people evaluate and judge members of their own self-defined group as being better and fairer than members of other groups (outgroup disadvantage). Social psychologists have demonstrated in the last 30 years that even the smallest aspect of differentiation, like preference for flavor of ice cream or style of music, can trigger ingroup advantage. If the group-building factor is a person's race, then cross-race effect appears.

=== Cross-race effect and emotion recognition ===
A meta-analysis of several studies about emotion recognition in facial expressions revealed that people could recognize and interpret the emotional facial expression of a person of their own race faster and better than of a person of another race. These findings apply to all races in the same way. Some studies show that other races, compared to one's own race, have differently shaped faces and different details within a facial expression, making it difficult for members of other races to decode emotional expressions. However, studies have shown that the mood of the observer does not affect the cross-race effect.

=== Social cognition ===
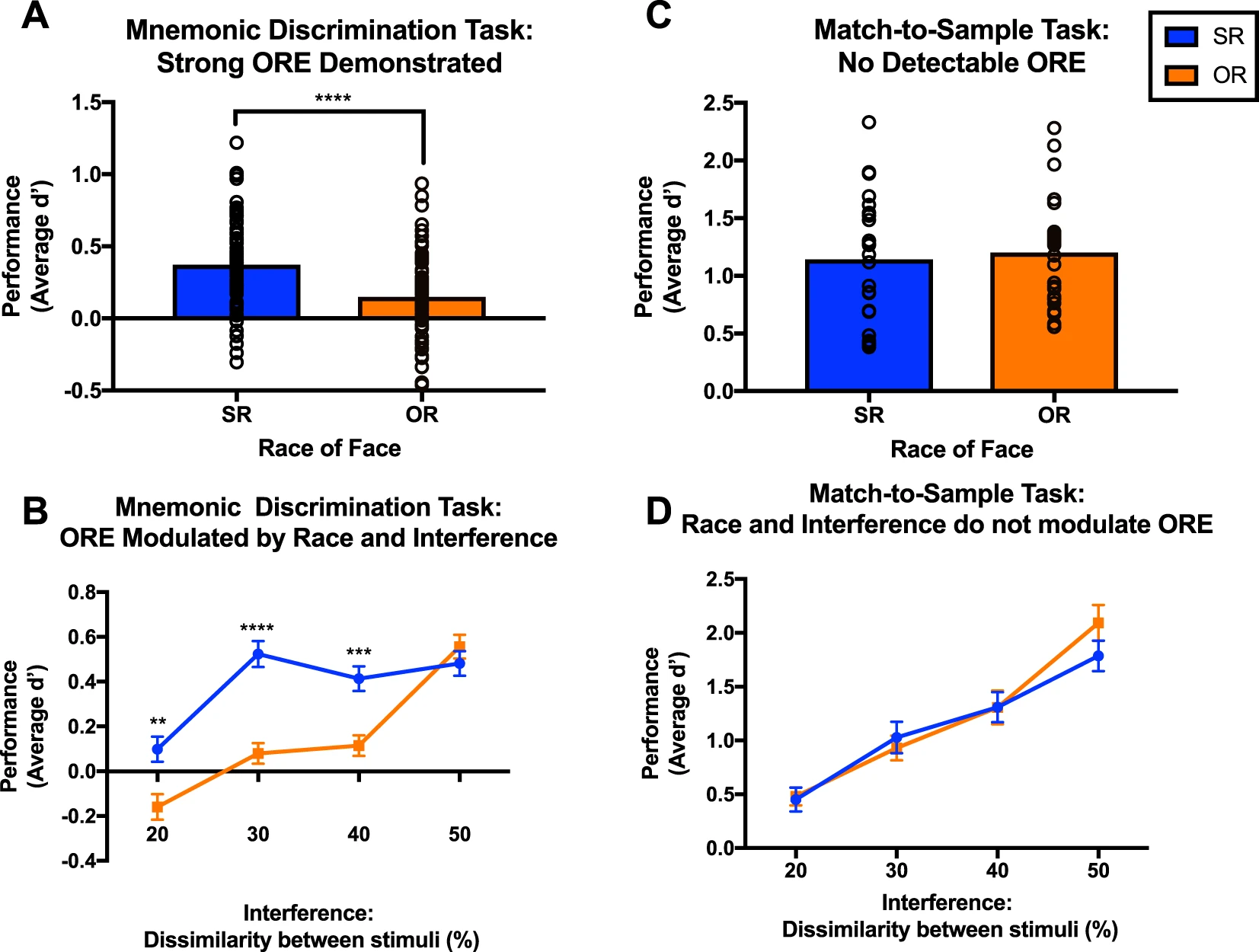
Figure 2 from "A Memory Computational Basis for the Other-Race Effect" (Yaros et al., 2019) that show evidence of the other race effect occurring when participants do a Mnemonic discrimination task but not a match to sample task, showing that mnemonic and proactive interference (old memories interfere with new) may contribute to the other-race effect (cross-race effect)

Research has shown that people tend to think more categorically about outgroup members and more individually about ingroup members. For example, outgroup members may associate specific facial features with a particular race or ethnicity, and do not notice the subtle variations in skin tone, lip size, or brow strength that ingroup members recognize. Categorical thinking happens more consistently for outgroup participants while individuation does the exact opposite. These different views between outgroup and ingroup members have been known to bias conceptual cognitive processes and show that the cross-race effect actually has less to do with race than with different levels of cognitive processing that occur for ingroup and outgroup members.

==== Cognitive disregard ====
Another set of cognitive theories related to cross-race effect focuses on how social categorization and individuation biases face memory. Some researchers believe that the inability for ingroup members' to recognize differences in the features of outgroup members can be explained through cognitive disregard. They find that the likelihood of falsely identifying a member of an out-group stems from an automatic encoding of a face without processing its unique features. Thus, when presented with an out-group member who has a similar face to the one that was encoded, the in-group member automatically, but incorrectly determines that the face has been "seen" before. These studies conclude that diminishing the cross race effect requires individuals to process ethnically-differing faces with the goal of encoding with individuation.

==== Depth of processing hypothesis ====
Depth of processing also influences the presence of the cross race effect. Same-race faces are more correctly and easily discerned because deep processing, than other-race faces are. This hypothesis, however, is controversial because of its inability to be replicated within studies.

==== Challenges for social cognition models ====
There are two challenges to the social cognition models (a) mixed evidence dealing with race accessibility, face perception, and memory and (b) the effects of development and training on the cross-race effect. Regarding the mixed evidence, the popular belief is that the more someone is exposed to people of different races the less likely they will be affected by the cross-race effect. There have been studies that support this theory, but other research has shown mixed results. For example, the results of studies done where the accessibility, as in how easy or not it is for a person to be around people of different races is manipulated, showed that this does not always affect face memory. Second, regarding the development and training effects, just because someone shows improvement with dealing with the cross-race effect due to exposure to cross race training or experience, it is not a direct prediction of a good social cognitive model. For the social cognitive model to start explaining such effects there would have to be evidence that ingroup and outgroup distinctions occur developmentally at the exact time the cross-race effect emerges in a child. There is some evidence showing when the cross-race effect first emerges, but there is little research directly testing the onset of ingroup and outgroup recognition biases in young children.

While social cognition models indicate a lack of effort to individuate other-race faces explains the cross-race effect, some research has challenged this by arguing that individuals do not spend less effort looking at other-race faces than same-race ones.

=== Perceptual expertise hypothesis ===
The perceptual expertise theory also suggest that if we identify the perceptual learning mechanisms that control perceptual expertise with face and non-face stimuli we will understand the cross-race effect. There are many models that deal with perceptual expertise, but all of these models share the idea that a human's face processing ability does not generalize equally to all faces. Hence, these theories propose that racial segregation results in people developing better expertise in distinguishing between faces of our own race or of a different race. Research around these theories also suggests that the more a child is exposed to cross-race face processing the lower the cross-race effect. However, if the child is not exposed to a lot of cross-race face processing the cross-race effect can increase. Furthermore, there is evidence that long term and short term exposure to cross-race face processing can improve recognition. In this view, the cross-race effect may not actually be a distinct, individual effect but rather an example of a larger difficulty in humans with the capacity to recognise unfamiliar groups and categories (such as unfamiliar sounds, animals, car models etc).

==== Challenges for perceptual expertise models ====
Challenges to the perceptual expertise models are the mixed evidence for the interracial contact hypothesis, and the varied results of the training effect. The mixed evidence shows that although there is some support to the theory that the more interracial contact a person has the better a person is at cross-race recognition, all the evidence gathered does not come to the same conclusion. This mixture of results causes the relationship between cross-race exposure and recognition ability to weaken. However, there may also be a third factor that contributes to these inconsistent findings. There is some evidence that the quality of cross-race contact has an effect on this relationship. For example, research supports the position that to be able to recognize cross-race faces one has to be attentive and effortful when encoding the face into memory. Training individuals has been shown to reduce the cross race effect in people, however this quick onset is coupled with a quick off set of the ability. Although, this short term training can translate into long term training, it is not the same as actually having real life experience with the cross-race effect. Finally, there are also other processes besides perceptual expertise that can influence cross-race recognition.

=== Effects of social cognition ===
Another reason the cross-race-effect may occur is that perceptions are often affected by motivations, expectations, and social cognition. Overall, the creation of norms has shaped and biased even simple perceptions such as line lengths. In terms of perception of faces, studies have shown that racially ambiguous faces that have been identified as one race or another based on their hairstyle are identified as having more features of the racial category represented by the hairstyle. Similarly, faces of an ambiguous but equal shade are interpreted as darker or lighter when accompanied by the label of either "black" or "white", respectively. Other social cognitive biases may also have the ability to overpower the cross-race-effect. A study has shown that social perception of wealth has the ability to modulate the effect: when the targets were seen as impoverished, the difference in facial recognition disappeared.

=== Integration of cross-race effect theories ===
==== Prototypes ====
Individuals develop and store a face prototype each time they encounter a face unique to ones he or she has previously encountered (usually ones that differ in features compared to their ethnic group). From their studies, researchers have concluded that when an individual belonging to an ethnicity that differs from their own, he or she forms a prototype and reserves it for future use, if and when necessary. The prototype view raises concern, however, because individuals storing these unique faces may ignore the fact that everyone has features that may be only special to their makeup, and may not apply to everyone belonging to that particular ethnic group or race; thus, this results in more false alarms during eyewitness testimony or identifying perpetrators in lineups.

=== Race-feature theory ===
Deeper study of the cross-race effect has demonstrated two types of processing for the recognition of faces: featural and holistic. It has been found that holistic processing (which occurs beyond individual parts of the face) is more commonly used in same-race situations, but there is an experience effect, which means that as a person gains more experience with those of a particular race, he or she will begin to use more holistic processing. Featural processing is much more commonly used with an unfamiliar stimulus or face.

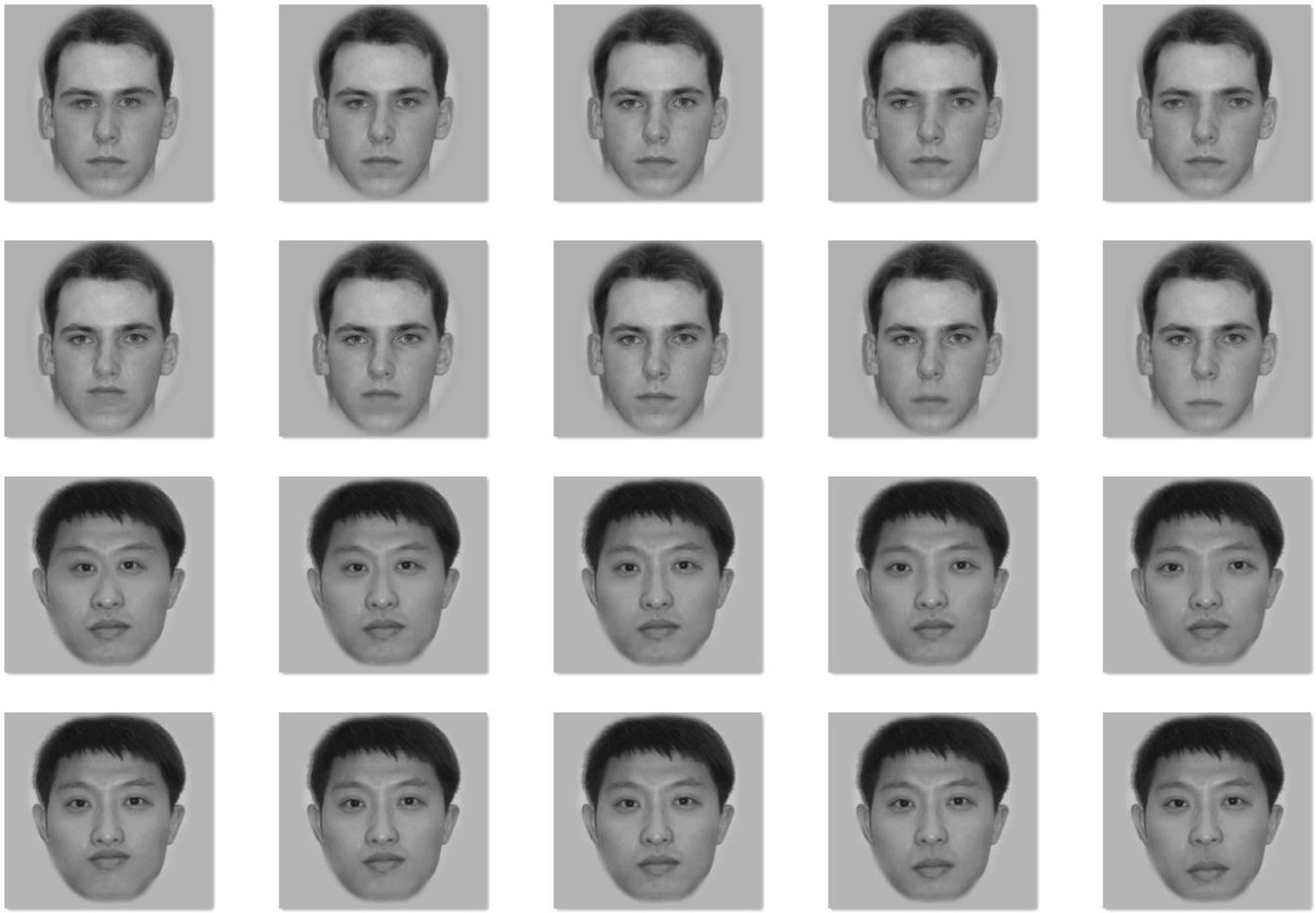
Sample of real and edited white and Asian faces used in study of the Cross-race effect

In his 1996 study, researchers noticed that when looking at ethnicity, in-group faces are processed without acknowledgement of ethnic-specific details and features. People code faces that deviate from the norm of their ethnic group through the absence or presence of distinctive ethnic features.

This is supported by the finding that the classification of other-race faces tends to be faster than same-race faces. This suggests that race seems to be a more perceptually salient feature than other more discerning facial features when the face belongs to a different race. Some eye tracking studies found tentative evidence for such a hypothesis by demonstrating that people look at different facial features in same- versus other-race faces. The general trend observed is that people fixate the eyes of a face with higher probability if it belongs to the same ethnic group as the observer her- or himself. Other studies found stable differences of similar magnitude between the looking behavior of Asian observers, who tend to fixate the center of the face, and European observers, who tend to fixate major facial features (e.g., eyes), for both own- and other-race faces. This was previously explained as stemming from a more clustered density-gradient for other-race faces than same race faces. The reasoning is that this causes more nodes to become activated in reaction to an other-race face, resulting in faster classification, but less discriminability in terms of memory. However, these exemplar-based theories cannot explain why faces that are ambiguous in terms of social category information can influence recognition. Further, other work suggests that many basic perceptual decisions such as inferring a face's identity are computed within the first one or two fixations. These initial fixations are highly similar across ethnicities/cultures of the face/observer, suggesting that critical traits such as familiarity, identity, and sex/gender are computed with a common eye movement and perceptual encoding strategy shared across humans, with culture/ethnicity-specific differences only emerging later on in the scan path.

=== Contact hypothesis theory ===
One method researchers have suggested to help mollify the prevalence of the cross race effect is through application of the contact hypothesis. Accurate recognition and identification of other-race faces, researchers have deduced, stems from a difference in learning experiences that relate to individual ethnic groups. The cross race effect can be reduced by continual exposure to ethnic groups that differ from one's own; the more positive interactions that occur between two ethnic groups, the more heterogeneous the ethnicities will seem to be. The type of contact experienced between the two ethnic groups also plays a major role in this hypothesis' effectiveness; the more intimate the contact, the higher the chances become of accurately recognizing a member of a different ethnicity than one's own As an example, research done on Asian and white students living in Singapore and Canada showed a significant cross race effect that was not able to be predicted by perceived familiarity with the other race. Previously seen as evidence against the contact hypothesis, it is now seen as evidence that the depth of contact is an important factor.

== Empirical findings ==
=== The cross-race effect across ethnic groups ===
Although most studies done about the cross race effect are with black and white participants, there are also numerous studies done with people of different ethnic backgrounds. For example, there are studies done that compare Hispanic with black and white participants, black with white and Japanese participants, Chinese with Korean and white participants, Chinese with Indian and other East Asian ethnic participants, Turkish and German participants, and finally a study has been done comparing Arab and Israeli Jews. The data from all of these studies have come to the same conclusion. The cross-race effect is evident among all people of all different races.

=== Morphological basis ===
The cross race effect has a morphological basis: The facial appearance is morphologically different for different ethnic backgrounds. This has been established empirically, wherein a large set of 3D scans of faces from different ethnic backgrounds was automatically clustered into groups. Only facial landmark distances were used in this grouping. The result was that gender, as well as ethnicity, emerged as primary factors of group membership.

While the cross-race effect has been observed for adult faces, research indicates that infant faces do not produce a cross-race effect; infant faces seem to automatically draw the viewer's attention with the ethnicity of the infant having no effect.

=== Immersion vs. upbringing ===
==== Children and face identification ====
With the help of several conducted studies, researchers conclude that the accuracy of eyewitness memory is significantly affected by the ethnic identity of both the suspect and the eye-witness; an individual can more accurately recognize a face belonging to their race than an individual whose race differs from that of their own. Previous studies have analyzed how the cross-race effect affects adults during eyewitness testimony but fails to address the possible existence of age-related confounding factors: On one hand, as an individual grows older and encounters more members of the other ethnic group in question, the novelty of the ethnic difference wears off and makes it less distracting, and the individual can pay higher absolute and relative amounts of attention to subtle distinctions between members of that group; on the other hand, time also increases the individual's exposure to biases prevalent in their own in-group, as well as compounding the effects of any self-reinforcement bias that the individual exhibits with respect to their preexisting opinions. The literature available on this topic is minute and conflicting; some researchers have found a prevalence of the cross-race effect in both white and black children, yet others have reported findings of children possessing the ability to discern other-race faces accurately. In their aim to identify developmental differences, researchers such as Pezdek et al. discovered that children recognize faces belonging to their own race more effectively than faces belonging to another race.

== Consequences ==
=== Cross-race identification bias ===
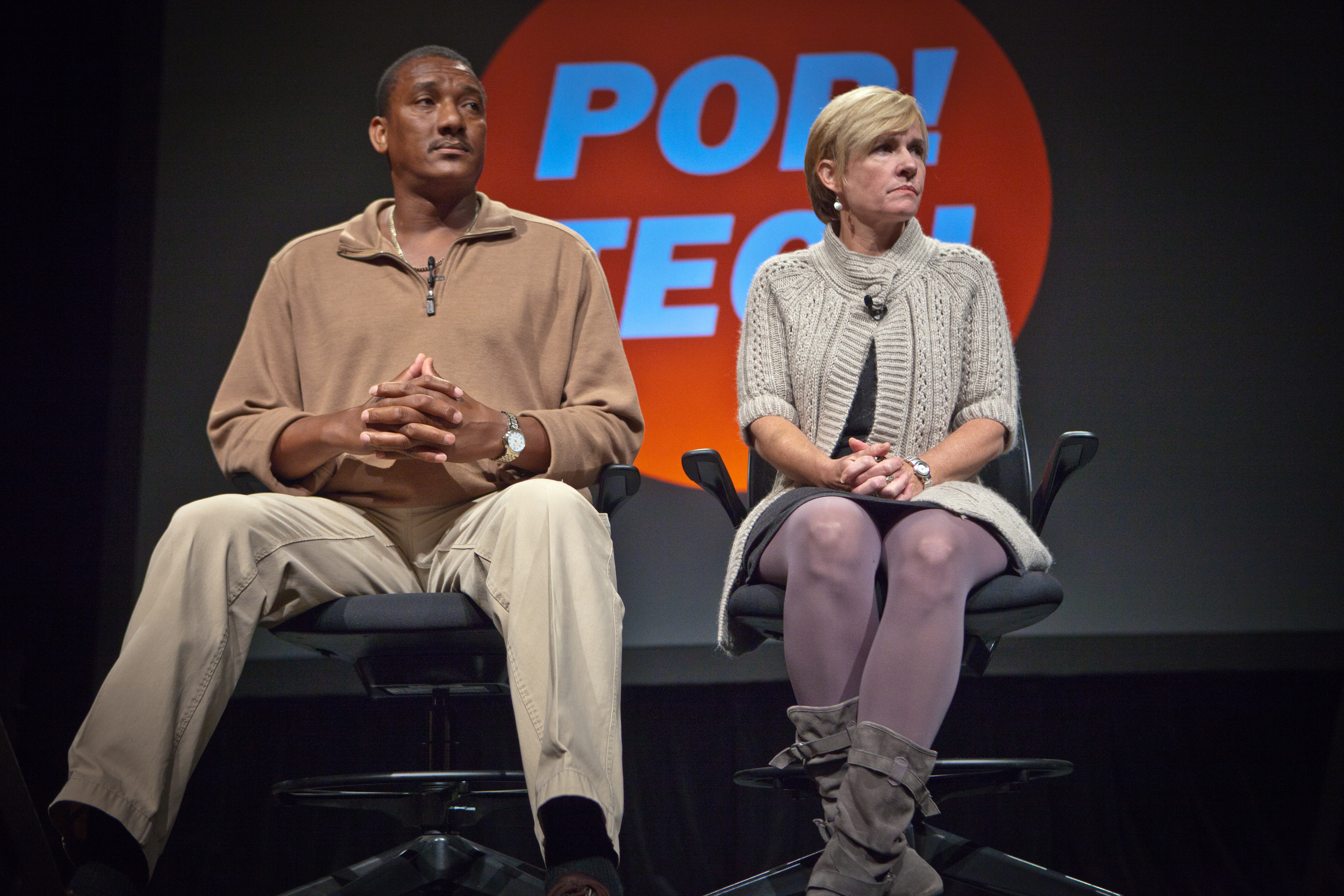
Ronald Cotton with Jennifer Thompson-Cannino at PopTech 2010. After Thompson-Cannino mistakenly identified Cotton as her rapist, Cotton was convicted of rape in 1985. A decade later, DNA evidence exonerated him. The case is often used as a real world example of the cross-race effect and the potential dangers of eyewitness testimony and lineup identification.

This effect refers to the decreased ability of people of one race to recognize faces and facial expressions of people of another race. This differs from the cross-race bias because this effect is found mostly during eyewitness identification as well as identification of a suspect in a line-up. In these situations, many people feel as if members of a race other than their own look alike, and they have difficulty distinguishing between members of different ethnic groups. Cross-race identification bias is also known as the misinformation effect since people are considered to be misinformed about other races and have difficulty identifying them. A study was made which examined 271 real court cases. In photographic line-ups, 231 witnesses participated in cross-race versus same-race identification. In cross-race lineups, only 45% were correctly identified versus 60% for same-race identifications. In a study dealing with eyewitness testimony, investigators examined forty participants in a racially diverse area of the US. Participants watched a video of a property crime being committed, then in the next 24 hours came to pick the suspect out of a photo line-up. Most of the participants in the study either misidentified the suspect or stated the suspect was not in the line-up at all. Correct identification of the suspect occurred more often when the eyewitness and the suspect were of the same race. In another study, 86 convenience store clerks were asked to identify three customers: one white, one black, and one Mexican, all of whom had purchased in the store earlier that day. The clerks tended to identify customers belonging to their own race accurately, but were more likely to make errors when attempting to identify other races members. Meanwhile, another study found that "alcohol intoxication reduces the own-race bias in face recognition," albeit by impairing accurate perception and leaving in place or increasing random error rather than by improving facial recognition of members of other groups.

There has been some disagreement about the consistency of the own-race bias. However, data gathered from multiple studies does show that the own-race bias is very consistent. Where it is not consistent, such as in a study done on white students in England and white and black students in South Africa, there are other factors associated. In this study the black South African students were slightly better at identifying white faces, but this is thought to be related to the significant contact the black students had with white students in University, as black non-students in South Africa were found to exhibit their own race bias. The own-race bias occurs in people of all races. Since eyewitness identification can be problematic, researchers have started to conduct studies of own-race biases using more forensics. This kind of research needs to pay more attention to a target's distinctive features and level of attractiveness. If a target is very distinctive or very attractive, it could reduce the cross-race effect because that person would be easier to identify.

Psychological experts all agree that the cross-race effect is a common occurrence during in-court testimony when an eyewitness is trying to remember a person. In order to reduce the cross-race effect there have been multiple changes to how policemen handle eyewitness identification. For example, to reduce the cross-race identification bias Britain has a law that states police must include the suspect in a line up with at least eight other people who share similar characteristics to him or her. This forces the eyewitness to use their memory of the suspects features, not the suspect's race, as a form of identification. However, as evidence shows that cross race identification is more difficult when faces are viewed in a group, cross race identification still poses a risk.

=== Economic ===
Research has shown, that when making financial decisions, specific facial characteristics and implicit bias can influence the perceived trustworthiness of another person.

== Mitigation of cross-race effect ==
Studies beyond the contact hypothesis have also been done to mitigate the cross-race effect. A study was done in which participants were forewarned about cross-race effect. Results from this study showed that the cross-race effect could be reduced and sometimes even eliminated when participants were wary of it. Research has also found that individuation training in which other race faces are given specific characteristics can mitigate the cross-race effect. In the study, white participants were trained to identify faces from one race (ex. African American) by specific letters and categorize another race (ex. Asian) using only one letter. Results found that participants were better able to distinguish other race faces that were individuated better than those that were categorized, despite equal exposure. In a study done on 43 white men, administering oxytocin before participants memorized faces was also found to reduce the cross-race effect.

== Related biases ==
Similar biases have been found for aspects other than race. There is an own-gender bias, although evidence suggests that this comes down to hair style recognition. Also, there is an own-age bias where people are better at recognising people of a similar age as themselves.

== See also ==
- Discrimination
- Ethnic group
- Face perception
- Ingroup bias
- List of cognitive biases
- List of memory biases
- Ingroups and outgroups
- Out-group homogeneity bias
- In-group favoritism
- Passing
- Prosopagnosia
- Racialism
- Racism
- Stereotype
- Uncanny valley
