= Flashed face distortion effect =

Visual illusion

Video of the effect

The flashed face distortion effect is a visual illusion in which ordinary human faces appear grotesque, distorted and caricature-like, when the images flash in the periphery, while the viewer specifically focuses on the cross midway between the two faces.

A 2019 paper in Scientific Reports found that the effect is equally strong when the faces are upside down. This suggests that the effect is independent of the face perception functionality of the human brain, which tends to react much stronger to right-side up faces than to inverted faces.
