= Prototype-matching =

Cognitive science theory of pattern recognition

In cognitive science, prototype-matching is a theory of pattern recognition that describes the process by which a sensory unit registers a new stimulus and compares it to the prototype, or standard model, of said stimulus. Unlike template matching and featural analysis, an exact match is not expected for prototype-matching, allowing for a more flexible model. An object is recognized by the sensory unit when a similar prototype match is found.

The theory of multiple discrimination scaling has advanced prototype-matching and other template-matching theories.

== See also ==
- Perception
- Cognitive Psychology
- Geon (psychology)
