= Haptic perception =

Perception achieved by touch

Haptic perception (Greek: haptόs "palpable", haptikόs "suitable for touch") means literally the ability "to grasp something", and is also known as stereognosis. Perception in this case is achieved through the active exploration of surfaces and objects by a moving subject, as opposed to passive contact by a static subject during tactile perception. Haptic perception involves the cutaneous receptors of touch, and proprioceptors that sense movement and body position. The inability for haptic perception is known as astereognosis.

== History ==
The term haptik was coined by the German-Jewish Psychologist Max Dessoir in 1892, when suggesting a name for academic research into the sense of touch in the style of that in "acoustics" and "optics".

Gibson (1966) defined the haptic system as "[t]he sensibility of the individual to the world adjacent to his body by use of his body". Gibson and others further emphasized what Weber had realized in 1851: the close interdependence of haptic perception and body movement, and that haptic perception is active exploration.

The concept of haptic perception is related to the concept of extended physiological proprioception, according to which when a tool such as a stick is used, perceptual experience is transparently transferred to the end of the tool.

Haptic perception relies on the forces experienced during touch. This research allows the creation of "virtual", illusory haptic shapes with different perceived qualities, which has clear application in haptic technology.

== Exploratory procedures ==
People can rapidly and accurately identify three-dimensional objects by touch. They do so through the use of exploratory procedures, such as moving the fingers over the outer surface of the object or holding the entire object in the hand.

The following exploratory procedures have been identified so far:

1. Lateral motion
2. Pressure
3. Enclosure
4. Contour following

Thus gathered object or subject properties are size, weight, contour, surface and material characteristics, consistency and temperature. Along with the development of tactile sensors, some work has also been dedicated to developing exploratory behavior in robots.

== Perceptual deadband ==
Perceptual deadband is a region which captures perceptual limitations of human perception. The Weber fraction and the level crossings constant are employed to define the perceptual deadband for haptic force stimulus. The deadband has an important application in designing perceptually adaptive sampling mechanisms for haptic data compression, which is required for transmitting haptic data over a communication network.

There are many factors which affect the possible shapes of the perceptual deadband, for example:

1. Rate of change of force stimulus: The Weber fraction or level crossings constant decrease for a faster change in the force stimulus.
2. Temporal resolution: It is defined as the minimum time spacing required in perceiving two consecutive force samples.
3. Directional sensitivity: The study claims that the Weber fraction is a function of only the force magnitude, not the direction.
4. Task being performed: discriminative or comparative A user is more sensitive while doing a comparative task than a discriminative task. It is because one has to perceive changes only along one direction under the comparative task. All this signifies that the perceptual deadband is a function of the task to be carried out.

== Impairments of haptic sensitivity ==
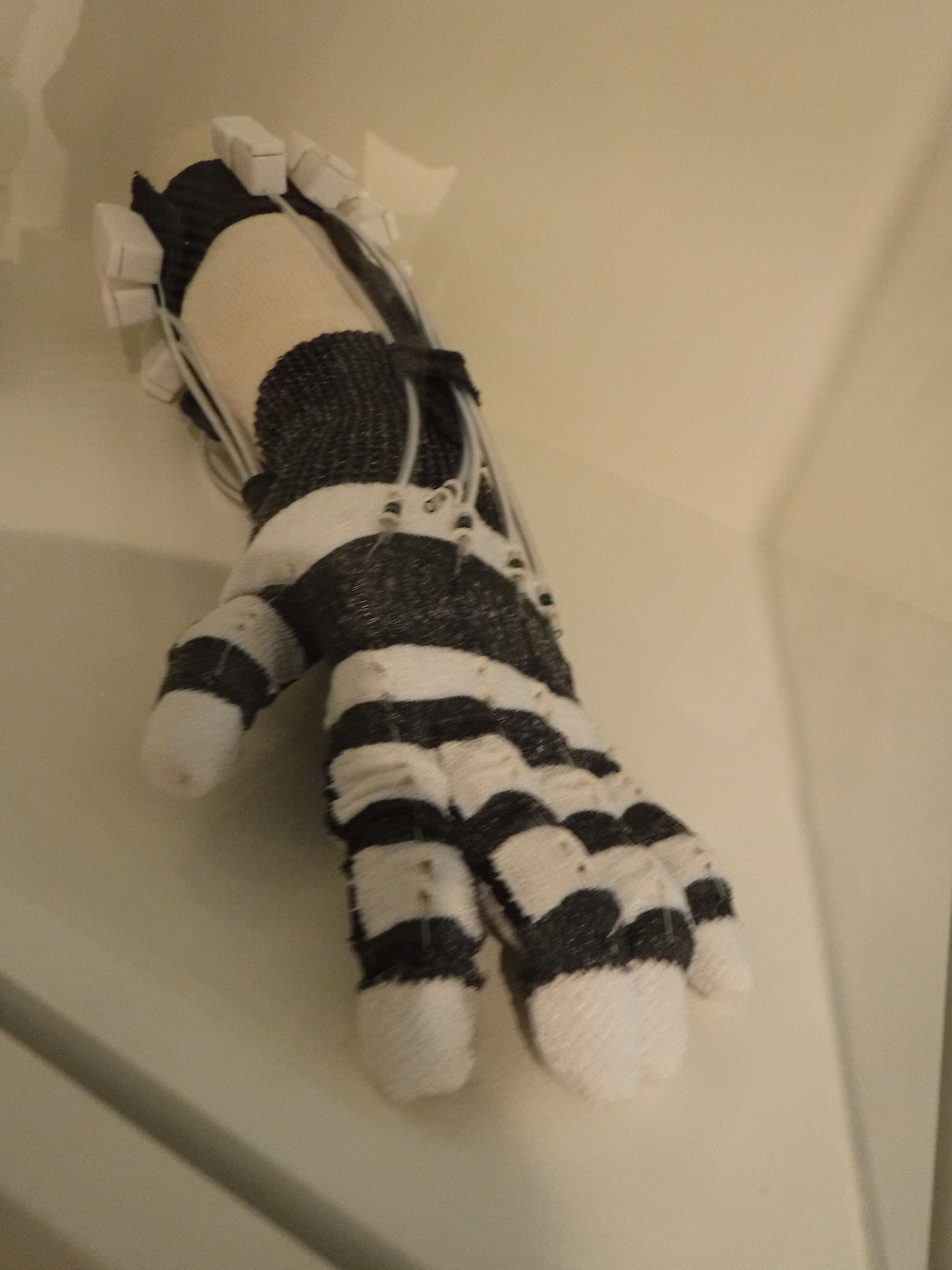
Exo-Skin Soft Haptic exoskeletal interface

Haptic sensitivity can be impaired by a multitude of diseases and disorders, predominantly relating to skin injuries such as cuts and burns, and nerve lesions (through injury or impaired circulation). Additionally, loss of sensitivity (neuropathy) may be caused by metabolic, toxic and/or immunologic factors. Examples of medical conditions that can cause neuropathies are diabetes mellitus, chronic kidney disease, thyroid dysfunction (hyper- and hypothyroidism) as well as hepatitis, liver cirrhosis and alcohol dependency. Autism, sensory processing disorder, etc. can also affect haptic sensitivity. Loss of the sense of touch is a catastrophic deficit that can impair walking and other skilled actions such as holding objects or using tools.

== Haptic therapy ==
Immersive environments can recreate the feeling of haptic interaction. Exoskeletal gloves such as the Exo-Skin Soft Haptic exoskeletal interface, developed at Drexel University, can be programmed to take a patient through a program of physical therapy exercises to retrain muscles and senses.

== See also ==
- Haptic communication
- Haptic technology
- Somatosensory system
