= Routine =

Routine may refer to:

== Arts, entertainment, and media ==
- "Routine" (SWT), the first of four stories in the second issue of the Star Wars Tales series
- Choreographed routine, orchestrated dance involving several performers
- Comedy routine, comedic act or part of an act
- The Routine (album), by Hotwire, 2003
- "The Routine", the first episode of the HBO series Oz
- "The Routine" (The Amazing World of Gumball), an episode of The Amazing World of Gumball
- "Routine" (Alan Walker and David Whistle song), a bonus track by Alan Walker from his 2018 album Different World
- Routine (video game), a survival horror game developed by Lunar Software and published by Raw Fury

== Computing ==
- Routine, another name for a computer program
  - Coroutine, generalized reentrant computer subroutine having multiple entry points
  - Subroutine, a routine inside another routine

== Other uses ==
- Ethnomethodology, sociological discipline focused on the methods groups use to create societal order
- Routine activity theory, sub-field of criminology
- Routinization of authority, the process through which a charismatic authority becomes a bureaucracy
- Routine life or everyday life
- Schedule, or timetable, a basic time-management tool to formalize or develop a routine
- Visual routine, visual cognitive means of extracting information from a scene
