= Constructive perception =

Constructive perception is the theory of perception in which the perceiver uses sensory information and other sources of information to construct a cognitive understanding of a stimulus. In contrast to this top-down approach, there is the bottom-up approach of direct perception. Perception is more of a hypothesis, and the evidence to support this is that "Perception allows behaviour to be generally appropriate to non-sensed object characteristics," meaning that we react to obvious things that, for example, are like doors even though we only see a "long, narrow rectangle as the door is ajar."

Also known as intelligent perception, constructive perception shows the relationship between intelligence and perception. This comes from the importance of high-order thinking and learning in perception. During perception, hypotheses are formed and tested about percepts that are based on three things: sensory data, knowledge, and high-level cognitive processes. Visual sensations are usually correctly attributed because we unconsciously assimilate information from many sources and then unconsciously make judgments based on this information. The philosophy of Immanuel Kant explains that our perception of the world is reciprocal; it both is affected by and affects our experience of the world.

== Evidence of constructive perception ==
Context effects are not explained by bottom-up theories of accounting. Irving Biederman performed experiments that demonstrated dramatic context effects. For example, Stephen Palmer carried out an experiment in which the participants were asked to identify objects after they were shown either a relevant or irrelevant context. They might be shown a scene of a baseball game, followed by images of a baseball, car, and a phone. The stimuli that was most relevant to the context, the baseball, was recognized quicker than those that were irrelevant, car and phone.

Perceptual constancy gives evidence that high-level constructive processes occur during perception. As lighting conditions change, the color of objects, such as bananas or cherries, appear to remain constant. Even when there is not enough light to even stimulate cone cells and give the sensation of color, bananas and cherries are still perceived as yellow and red, respectively.

Configural-superiority effect is another compelling context effect. This effect is demonstrated by the decrease in response time by participants when identifying objects in complex configurations over objects in isolation. For example, four diagonal lines are shown and participants are asked the location of the odd line indicated by its different orientation. In another condition, an L-shaped fixed context is added; this creates three triangles and another object made of three lines. Participants were able to discern the odd three line object from the set of triangles quicker than the single diagonal lines alone.

== Examples ==
You are traveling down a road you have never been on before, up ahead you see an octagonal red sign with white letters near an intersection. The sign has a vine growing on it, and all you can read is "ST_P." These letters alone are meaningless, however taken in its context and using knowledge from past experiences you infer that it is a stop sign. This is example of constructive perception because it required intelligence and thought to combine sensory information, a red octagonal sign with "ST_P" in white letters at an intersection, and knowledge from past experiences, stop signs are red octagonal signs with "STOP" in white letters placed at an intersection, to perceive it as a stop sign.

== Theories ==
A theory on how perception can be constructed in the nervous system is based on the cybernetic mechanisms of anapoiesis, which means re-creation. As a physiological mechanism, reconstructive perception has been proposed to be a function of metabotropic receptors and G protein-gated ion channels, which are hypothesised to temporality rewire neural networks.

== See also ==
- Perception
- Cognitive psychology
- Cognitive science
