= Hong Z. Tan =

Chinese-American haptics researcher

Hong Z. Tan (Chinese: 张虹) is a Chinese-American researcher in haptic technology and haptic perception. She is a professor of electrical and computer engineering at Purdue University.

== Education and career ==
Tan is originally from Shanghai. She studied biomedical engineering at Shanghai Jiao Tong University, graduating in 1986, and went to the Massachusetts Institute of Technology for graduate study in electrical engineering and computer science. She earned a master's degree in 1988, and completed her Ph.D. in 1996.

As well as her position in electrical engineering and computer science at Purdue, Tan holds courtesy appointments in Purdue's departments of mechanical engineering and psychological sciences. In 2006, she became founding chair of the IEEE Technical Committee on Haptics. She has taken leaves from Purdue to head the Human Computer Interaction Group at Microsoft Research Asia, to take a professorship in psychology at Beijing Normal University, and to work as lead haptics scientist for Google.

== Research ==
Tan's research has included the development of chairs that can sense the posture of people sitting in them, and wearable devices that can translate spoken language into vibrations that can be felt on the skin, as a way of making speech accessible to hearing-impaired people.

== Recognition ==
Tan was named an IEEE Fellow in 2017, "for contributions to wearable haptics".
