= Richard Maurice Bucke =

Canadian psychiatrist (1837–1902)

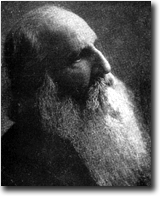
Richard Maurice Bucke

Richard Maurice Bucke (18 March 1837 – 19 February 1902) was a Canadian psychiatrist in the late 19th century. An adventurer during his youth, Bucke later studied medicine. Eventually, as a psychiatrist, he headed the provincial Asylum for the Insane in London, Ontario. Bucke was a friend of several noted men of letters in Canada, the United States, and England. Besides publishing professional articles, Bucke wrote three non-fiction books: Man's Moral Nature, Walt Whitman, and Cosmic Consciousness: A Study in the Evolution of the Human Mind, which is his best-known work.

== Early life ==
Richard Maurice Bucke was born in 1837 in Methwold, England, the son of Rev. Horatio Walpole Bucke (a parish curate) and his wife Clarissa Andrews. The parents and their children emigrated to Canada when he was a year old, settling near London, Upper Canada.

Horatio W. Bucke had given up the profession of religious minister, and trusted his family's income to their Ontario farm. A sibling in a large family, Richard Maurice Bucke was a typical farm boy of that era. He was an athletic boy who enjoyed a good ball game. When he left home at the age of 16, he traveled to Columbus, Ohio and then to California. Along the way, Bucke worked at various odd jobs. He was part of a travelling party who had to fight for their lives when they were attacked by a group of Shoshone people, on whose territory they were trespassing.

In the winter of 1857–58, he was nearly frozen to death in the mountains of California, where he was the sole survivor of a silver-mining party. He had to walk out over the mountains and suffered extreme frostbite. As a result, a foot and several of his toes were amputated. He then returned to Canada via the Isthmus of Panama, probably in 1858. Henry Mills Hurd says he returned to Canada in 1860.

== Medicine and psychiatry ==
Bucke enrolled in McGill University's medical school in Montreal, where he delivered a distinguished thesis in 1862. Although he practiced general medicine briefly as a ship's surgeon (in order to pay for his sea travel), he later specialized in psychiatry. He did his internship in London (1862–63) at University College Hospital. During that time he visited France.

He was for several years an enthusiast of Auguste Comte's positivist philosophy. Comte's belief that religion, if by that is meant spirituality, had been outmoded by science contrasts with Bucke's later belief concerning the nature of reality.

Bucke returned to Canada in 1864 and married Jessie Gurd in 1865; they had eight children. In January 1876, Bucke became the superintendent of the Asylum for the Insane in Hamilton, Ontario. In 1877, he was appointed head of the provincial Asylum for the Insane in London, Ontario, a post he held for nearly the remainder of his life. In his work with asylum inmates, he was a reformer who encouraged organized sports and what is now called occupational therapy. Some of his surgical treatments proved deeply controversial. After adopting the Victorian-era theory that mental illness in women was often due to defective reproductive organs, Bucke began performing surgical removals of these organs from female patients. He continued this practice until his death, despite receiving increasing amounts of criticism from the medical health care community.

== Experience of "cosmic consciousness" ==
In 1872, after an evening of stimulating conversation with his friend Walt Whitman in the countryside, Richard M Bucke was traveling back to London in a buggy when he had a religious experience. He later described the characteristics and effects of the faculty of experiencing this type of consciousness as:

- its sudden appearance
- a subjective experience of light ("inner light")
- moral elevation
- intellectual illumination
- a sense of immortality
- loss of a fear of death
- loss of a sense of sin

Bucke's personal experience of the inner state had yet another attribute, mentioned separately by the author: the vivid sense of the universe as a living presence, rather than as basically lifeless, inert matter.

The supreme occurrence of that night was his real and sole initiation to the new and higher order of ideas. But it was only an initiation. He saw the light but had no more idea whence it came and what it meant than had the first creature that saw the light of the sun.

Bucke did not immediately record the details and interpretation of his experience. This was not done until years later, and only after he had researched much of the world's literature on mysticism and enlightenment and had corresponded with many others about this subject.

== Cosmic Consciousness ==
Bucke's magnum opus was his book Cosmic Consciousness: A Study in the Evolution of the Human Mind. The book is a compilation of various theories rather than strictly a simple record of his original mystical experience.

Bucke borrowed the term "cosmic consciousness" from Edward Carpenter, who had traveled and studied religion in the East. Bucke's friend, Carpenter, had derived the term "cosmic consciousness" from the Eastern term "universal consciousness." In his description of his personal experience, Bucke combined his recollection with thoughts of another of his friends, Caleb Pink ("C.P.")—and others—and recorded his experience in a poetic style.

Cosmic Consciousness was a book which he researched and wrote over a period of many years. It was published in 1901 and has been reprinted several times since then. In it, Bucke describes his own experience, the experiences of contemporaries (most notably Walt Whitman), and the experiences of historical figures, including Jesus, Saint Paul, Muhammad, Plotinus, Dante, Francis Bacon, William Blake, Buddha, and Ramakrishna.

Bucke developed a theory that posited three stages in the development of consciousness:

- the simple consciousness of animals
- the self-consciousness of the mass of humanity (encompassing reason, imagination, and foresight)
- cosmic consciousness — an emerging faculty which is the next stage of human development

Within self-consciousness, there exist gradations among individuals in their degrees of intellectual development and talent. (Bucke considered that no doubt there would be gradations within the level of cosmic consciousness, as well.)

Among the effects of humanity's natural evolutionary progression, Bucke believed he detected a long historical trend in which religious conceptions and theologies had become less and less frightening.

In Cosmic Consciousness, beginning with Part II, Bucke explains how animals developed the senses of hearing and seeing. Further development culminated in the ability to experience and enjoy music. Bucke states that, initially, only a small number of humans were able to see colors and experience music. But eventually these new abilities spread throughout the human race until only a very small number of people were unable to experience colors and music.

In Part III, Bucke hypothesizes that the next stage of human development, which he calls "cosmic consciousness," is slowly beginning to appear and will eventually spread throughout all of humanity.

Bucke's vision of the world was profoundly optimistic. He wrote in Part I (“First Words”) “that the universe is so built and ordered that without any peradventure all things work together for the good of each and all, that the foundation principle of the world is what we call love and that the happiness of every one is in the long run absolutely certain.”

== Involvement with poetry and literature ==
Bucke was deeply involved in the poetry scene in America and had friends among the literati, especially those who were poets. In 1869, he read Leaves of Grass by Walt Whitman, an American poet, and was deeply impressed by it. In Cosmic Consciousness, he notes that his cosmic consciousness experience occurred following a night reading Whitman and Romantic poets. Later, he met Whitman in 1877 in Camden, New Jersey, and the two developed a lasting friendship.

Bucke later testified that he was "lifted to and set upon a higher plane of existence" because of his friendship with Whitman. He published a biography of Whitman in 1883 and was one of Whitman's literary executors.

In 1882, Bucke was elected to the English Literature Section of the Royal Society of Canada.

== Death ==
On 19 February 1902, Bucke slipped on a patch of ice in front of his home and struck his head. He died a few hours later without regaining consciousness.

== Legacy ==
Bucke's concept of cosmic consciousness has been engaged by many other people across genres. His work is directly referenced by the mystics Franklin Merrell-Wolff and Ouspensky, and it was essential to Aldous Huxley's concept of the perennial philosophy and Evelyn Underhill's concept of mysticism. Aurobindo uses the term cosmic consciousness in his work. Ramana Maharshi was asked about the nature of realization attained by westerners experiences cosmic consciousness, which he described as temporary and different from the realization of one's true eternal self. Erich Fromm says, in Psychoanalysis and Zen Buddhism, "What Bucke describes as cosmic consciousness is, in my opinion, precisely the experience which is called satori in Zen Buddhism" and that "Bucke's book is perhaps the book most germane to the topic of this article."

Along with William James's classic work The Varieties of Religious Experience (which cites Bucke), Bucke's Cosmic Consciousness has become part of the foundation of transpersonal psychology.

Bucke was part of a movement that sought to improve the care and treatment of mentally ill persons.

He was one of the founders of the Medical School of the University of Western Ontario. His papers are held at Western University's Archives and Research Collections Centre.

He was portrayed by Colm Feore in the 1990 Canadian film Beautiful Dreamers.

R. M. Bucke Memorial Society for the Study of Religious Experience, established by Raymond Prince in Montréal in 1964 as one of the first scientific societies whose aim was to investigate those characteristics of religious experience of interest to psychiatry. The society published several documents including Trance and Possession States in 1966, until the early 1990s. The archives are found at Western University's library.

== Publications ==
- Bucke, R. M. (1879). Man's Moral Nature: An Essay. New York: G. P. Putnam's Sons.
- Bucke, R. M. (1883). Walt Whitman. Philadelphia: D. Mackay. OCLC 859421735.
- Bucke, R. M. (1901). Cosmic Consciousness: A Study in the Evolution of the Human Mind (1st ed.). E. P. Dutton and Company.
  - Bucke, R. M. (1905). Cosmic Consciousness: A Study in the Evolution of the Human Mind (PDF). Philadelphia: Innes & Sons.
  - Bucke, R. M. (2015). Cosmic Consciousness: A Study in the Evolution of the Human Mind. Merchant Books. ISBN 978-1603866972.
- Bucke, R. M. (1971) [1863]. Diary of R. Maurice Bucke, M.D., C.M. Canada: (n.p.).
- Bucke, R. M.; Whitman, W. (1977). Lozynsky, Artem (ed.). Richard Maurice Bucke, Medical Mystic: Letters of Dr. Bucke to Walt Whitman and his Friends. Detroit: Wayne State University Press. ISBN 0814315763.
- Bucke, R. M. (1997). Greenland, Cyril; Colombo, John Robert (eds.). The New Consciousness: Selected Papers of Richard Maurice Bucke. Toronto: Colombo & Company. ISBN 978-1896308326.

== See also ==
- Recept
- Walter Russell
