= Recept =

"Recept" (pronounced /ˈriːˌsɛpt/) is a term used in the work of 19th-century psychologist George Romanes to refer to an idea that is formed by the repetition of percepts (i.e., successive percepts of the same object). The idea is similar to that of concatenated impressions, as seen in the work of David Hume. It is also associated with the concepts of "construct" and "influent".

In the book Mental Evolution of Man, Romanes introduced recept to support his argument that Charles Darwin's theory of the origin of language is valid by presenting more evidence from philology. In his conceptualization, recept denotes the process, which involves memory, that transpires when a human child as a "higher animal" is faced with a sensory situation it perceives as familiar. This familiarity elicits a response based on its meaning and significance. Romanes also stated that, recept or a receptual thought is a compound idea - one the differs from a general or abstract idea - of past similar perceptions. It has been interpreted as an idea that one is not aware he has. It is noted that recept is not widely embraced because Romanes book is so little read. The term is used in Richard Maurice Bucke's book, Cosmic Consciousness: A Study in the Evolution of the Human Mind. Bucke was a 19th-century Canadian psychiatrist.

== See also ==
- Concept
- Percept
