= Cosmic Consciousness =

1901 book by Richard Bucke

Cosmic Consciousness: A Study in the Evolution of the Human Mind
- The title page
- Author: Richard Maurice Bucke
- Language: English
- Subject: Consciousness
- Published: 1901
- Publisher: Citadel Press
- Publication place: United States
- Media type: Print
- Pages: 358
- ISBN: 978-0-8065-0211-3

Cosmic Consciousness: A Study in the Evolution of the Human Mind is a 1901 book by the psychiatrist Richard Maurice Bucke, in which the author explores the concept of cosmic consciousness, which he defines as "a higher form of consciousness than that possessed by the ordinary man".

== Synopsis ==
In Cosmic Consciousness, Bucke stated that he discerned three forms, or degrees, of consciousness: simple consciousness, possessed by both animals and mankind; Self-consciousness, possessed by mankind, encompassing thought, reason, and imagination, and Cosmic consciousness, which is "a higher form of consciousness than that possessed by the ordinary man" According to Bucke, "This consciousness shows the cosmos to consist not of dead matter governed by unconscious, rigid, and unintending law; it shows it on the contrary as entirely immaterial, entirely spiritual and entirely alive; it shows that death is an absurdity, that everyone and everything has eternal life; it shows that the universe is God and that God is the universe, and that no evil ever did or ever will enter into it; a great deal of this is, of course, from the point of view of self consciousness, absurd; it is nevertheless undoubtedly true."

== Reception ==
Moores said that Bucke's cosmic consciousness is an interconnected way of seeing things "which is more of an intuitive knowing than it is a factual understanding". Moores pointed out that, for scholars of the purist camp, the experience of cosmic consciousness is incomplete without the element of love, "which is the foundation of mystical consciousness". Juan A. Herrero Brasas said that Bucke's cosmic consciousness refers to the evolution of the intellect, and not to "the ineffable revelation of hidden truths". According to Brasas, it was William James who equated Bucke's cosmic consciousness with mystical experience or mystical consciousness. Gary Lachman notes that today Bucke's experience would most likely be explained by the "God spot", or more generally as a case of temporal lobe epilepsy, but he is skeptical of these and other organic explanations.

== Similar concepts ==
According to Michael Robertson, Cosmic Consciousness and William James's 1902 book The Varieties of Religious Experience have much in common: "Both Bucke and James argue that all religions, no matter how seemingly different, have a common core; both believe that it is possible to identify this core by stripping away institutional accretions of dogma and ritual and focusing on individual experience; and both identify mystical illumination as the foundation of all religious experience." James popularized the concept of religious experience, (Note: The term "religious experience" has become synonymous with the terms "mystical experience", "spiritual experience", and "sacred experience".) which he explored in his 1902 book The Varieties of Religious Experience. He saw mysticism as a distinctive experience which supplies knowledge of the transcendental. He considered the "personal religion" to be "more fundamental than either theology or ecclesiasticism".

== Editions ==
- Bucke, Richard Maurice (1901), Cosmic Consciousness: A Study in the Evolution of the Human Mind (First ed.), New York: E. P. Dutton and Company – via Internet Archive

== See also ==
- Peak experience – Concept in psychology
- Spiritual evolution – Evolution of the mind or spirit
