= Context effect =

"THE CAT" is a classic example of context effect. We have little difficulty reading "H" and "A" in their appropriate contexts, even though they take on the same form in each word.

A context effect is an aspect of cognitive psychology that describes the influence of environmental factors on one's perception of a stimulus. The impact of context effects is considered to be part of top-down design. The concept is supported by the theoretical approach to perception known as constructive perception.

Context effects can impact our daily lives in many ways such as word recognition, learning abilities, memory, and object recognition. It can have an extensive effect on marketing and consumer decisions. For example, research has shown that the comfort level of the floor that shoppers are standing on while reviewing products can affect their assessments of products' quality, leading to higher assessments if the floor is comfortable and lower ratings if it is uncomfortable. Because of effects such as this, context effects are currently studied predominantly in marketing.

== Cognitive principles of context effects ==
Context effects employ top-down design when analyzing information. Top down design fuels understanding of an image by using prior experiences and knowledge to interpret a stimulus. This process helps us analyze familiar scenes and objects when encountering them. During perception of any kind, people generally use either sensory data (bottom-up design) or prior knowledge of the stimulus (top-down design) when analyzing the stimulus. Individuals generally use both types of processing to examine stimuli. The use of both sensory data and prior knowledge to reach a conclusion is a feature of optimal probabilistic reasoning, known as Bayesian inference; cognitive scientists have shown mathematically how context effects can emerge from the Bayesian inference process. When context effects occur, individuals are using environmental cues perceived while examining the stimuli in order to help analyze it. In other words, individuals often make relative decisions that are influenced by the environment or previous exposure to objects.

These decisions may be greatly influenced by these external forces and alter the way individuals view an object. For example, research has shown that people rank television commercials as either good or bad in relation to their enjoyment levels of the show during which the commercials are presented. The more they like or dislike the show the more likely they are to rate the commercials shown during the show more positively or negatively (respectively). Another example shows during sound recognition a context effect can use other sounds in the environment to change the way we categorize a sound.

Context effects can come in several forms, including configural superiority effect which demonstrates varying degrees of spatial recognition depending on if stimuli are present in an organized configuration or present in isolation. For example, one may recognize a fully composed object faster than its individual parts (object-superiority effect).

== Impact ==
Context effects can have a wide range of impacts in daily life. In reading difficult handwriting context effects are used to determine what letters make up a word. This helps us analyze potentially ambiguous messages and decipher them correctly. It can also affect our perception of unknown sounds based on the noise in the environment. For example, we may fill in a word we cannot make out in a sentence based on the other words we could understand. Context can prime our attitudes and beliefs about certain topics based on current environmental factors and our previous experiences with them.

Context effects can be nullified if we are made consciously aware of the outside stimulus or past history that may influence our decision. For example, a study conducted by Norbert Schwarz and Gerald Clore showed that when asked to rate their overall life satisfaction on either sunny or rainy days, people expressed greater satisfaction on sunny days and less satisfaction on rainy days. However, when people were reminded of the weather their satisfaction rating returned to an almost even distribution. This study demonstrates the effect the environment can have on perception, and that when pointed out, context effects can be nullified.

Context effects also affect memory. We are often better able to recall information in the location in which we learned it or studied it. For example, while studying for a test it is better to study in the environment that the test will be taken in (i.e. classroom) than in a location where the information was not learned and will not need to be recalled. This phenomenon is called transfer-appropriate processing.

=== Marketing ===
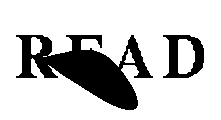
"READ" is a good example of the "context effects" role in the word superiority effect by having us assume that the E and the A behind the ink blot are completed.

Perhaps the greatest amount of research concerning context effects comes from marketing research. Context effects can influence consumers' choice behavior. There are three main context effects that are researched in marketing. The first, the compromise effect, states that objects that are priced in the middle of choice sets are looked on more favorably. The middle choice seems like a good compromise between choices that may be viewed as too extreme. For example, if there are bikes on sale at the local store ranging from $50 to $75; the average shopper, not looking for a luxury bicycle, would normally opt to choose the $60 bike because it is average and matches their level of expertise. However, when adding a $100 bike to the sale, most average shoppers would opt to select the higher $75 bike. This demonstrates the compromise effect of choosing a bike to match their expectations regarding middle prices.

The attractiveness effect, the second contextual effect on consumer behavior, maintains that one item will increase the attractiveness of another item that is similar, but superior to it. By showing that an item is superior to a similar one the likability and possible purchasing power of the superior item increases.

The similarity effect, the third contextual effect on consumers' behavior, states that an item will hurt a similar item more in sales than it will a dissimilar item. With two or more similar items competing for attention they will only detract from each other in the marketplace.

Firms looking to increase product resale can use these context effects to construct more profitable marketing strategies. The idea of these context effects in the marketing industry is to allow for more profitable items a boost in optional sharing; a productivity boost based on contextual effects for and against certain items.

Context Effect on Consumer Behavior

In a study conducted on 55 undergraduate marketing students at a university in Korea, researchers set up a mixed design to test if a visual framing promoting a greater use of alternative-based processing would reduce the perceived attractiveness of compromise options. They also hypothesized that the decision process would have minimal influence on the choice of asymmetrically dominating options.

Researchers split the participants into three conditions: attribute based processing treatment, alternative based processing treatment, and the control. In order to perpetuate attribute and alternative based processing in their participants, researchers used different visual tactics to present each product. In the attribute processing group, horizontal lines were drawn in between each attribute of a product option, highlighting the various attributes of the different products within the same choice set. Conversely, in the alternative treatment group, vertical lines were drawn in between individual product options to visually separate them from one another. The control group had no visual framing treatment. Further, researchers simultaneously assessed how the attractiveness and compromise effect impacts the probability of the consumer to choose a target brand by listing two attributes for each of the three products in the choice set. Depending on the extremity in differences between each product attribute, options were either placed in the compromise or asymmetrically dominant subgroup.

The findings of this study proved their hypothesis, as the frequency of how often the compromise option was chosen depends heavily on the difference in visual framing of the attribute and alternative based processing treatments. The study found that when the alternative treatment was not promoted, the compromise effect took precedence over the participants' decision making. Furthermore, the study showed that there was no significant difference between the attribute and control treatments, as the probability of choosing an asymmetrically dominant option was equally high across all three framing conditions.

=== Perception of Artwork ===
Context also affects the perception of artwork. Artworks presented in a classical museum context were liked more and rated more interesting than when presented in a sterile laboratory context. While specific results depend heavily on the style of the presented artwork, overall, the effect of context proved to be more important for the perception of artwork then the effect of genuineness (whether the artwork was being presented as original or as a facsimile/copy).

== See also ==
- Framing effect
