= Generic views =

The principal of generic views in the study of cognition stipulates that the interpretation made by an observer of a distal phenomenon should be such as to not require that the observer be in a special position to, or relationship with, the phenomenon in question. The principal is a fairly general account of the inductive bias that allows an observer to reconstruct distal phenomena from an impoverished proximal datum. This principle has been advanced particularly in vision research as an account of how, for example, three-dimensional structure is extracted from an inadequate two-dimensional projection.

The principal of generic views has been discussed by Richards and Hoffman (Note: Suppose in reality there’s a resource, like water, and you can quantify how much of it there is in an objective order—very little water, medium amount of water, a lot of water. Now suppose your fitness function is linear, so a little water gives you a little fitness, medium water gives you medium fitness, and lots of water gives you lots of fitness—in that case, the organism that sees the truth about the water in the world can win, but only because the fitness function happens to align with the true structure in reality. Generically, in the real world, that will never be the case. Something much more natural is a bell curve—say, too little water you die of thirst, but too much water you drown, and only somewhere in between is good for survival. Now the fitness function doesn’t match the structure in the real world. And that’s enough to send truth to extinction. For example, an organism tuned to fitness might see small and large quantities of some resource as, say, red, to indicate low fitness, whereas they might see intermediate quantities as green, to indicate high fitness. Its perceptions will be tuned to fitness, but not to truth. It won’t see any distinction between small and large—it only sees red—even though such a distinction exists in reality.—Donald D. Hoffman to Amanda Gefter), and has been given a sophisticated Bayesian formalization by Freeman.

== Relation to Bayesian inference ==
Another expression of the generic views principal is that the inference of distal structure should be such that the inference would remain substantially the same if the "position" of the observer were moderately altered (perturbed). If the inference made would have been qualitatively or categorically different under a perturbation of the observer, then the inference does not satisfy the generic views assumption, and should be rejected. (The question of what constitutes a qualitative or categorical difference is an interesting point of detail.) On this view, it can be argued that the principal of generic views is nothing more than an inference based on the maximum posterior probability (MAP) which accounts for aspects of observation. Thus, we infer the distal phenomenon which possess the highest probability of having generated the observations in question, and this probability incorporates (in addition to relevant priors) both the likelihood of the distal phenomenon generating certain observable signals, and the likelihood of the observer transducing those signals in a manner consistent with the observations. On such an analysis (and with various assumptions invoked), one can obtain a behavior approximating the generic views principal.
