= Sensory unit =

Sensory neuron

A sensory unit is a single afferent neuron with its receptor endings. It is the smallest unit of sensory response.
