= Extended physiological proprioception =

Ability to perceive at the tip of a tool

Extended physiological proprioception (EPP) is a concept pioneered by D.C. Simpson (1972) to describe the ability to perceive at the tip of a tool. Proprioception is the concept that proprioceptors in the muscles and joints couple with cutaneous receptors to identify and manage contacts between the body and the world. Extended physiological proprioception allows for this same process to apply to contacts between a tool that is being held and the world. The work was based on prostheses developed at the time in response to disabilities incurred by infants as the result of use of the drug thalidomide by mothers from 1957 to 1962, with the tool in this case simply being the prosthesis itself. How a person identifies with themself changes after a lower limb amputation affects body image, functioning, awareness, and future projections.

People with amputations have reported phantom limbs. This serves as evidence that the brain is hard-wired to perceive body image, making it notable that sensory input and proprioceptive feedback are not essential in its formation. Losing an anatomical part through amputation sets a person up for complex perceptual, emotional, and psychological responses. Such responses include phantom limb pain, which is the painful feeling some amputees incur after amputation in the area lost. Phantom limb pain permits a natural acceptance and use of prosthetic limbs.

== See also ==
- The Extended Mind
- Embodied cognition
- Situated cognition
