= Irving Biederman =

American vision scientist (1939–2022)

Irving Biederman (1939 – August 17, 2022) was an American vision scientist specializing in the study of brain processes underlying humans' ability to quickly recognize and interpret what they see. While best known for his Recognition by Components Theory that focuses on volumetric object recognition, his later work tended to examine the recognition of human faces. Biederman argued that face recognition is separate and distinct from the recognition of objects.

Biederman received his Ph.D. degree from the University of Michigan in 1966.

In addition to being a neuroscientist and professor of psychology at the State University of New York- University at Buffalo and professor of psychology and computer science at the USC College of Letters, Arts and Sciences, he was holder of the Harold Dornsife Chair in Cognitive Neuroscience at USC, and was also a member of the USC Program in Neural, Informational and Behavioral Sciences.

Biederman appeared on an episode of Penn & Teller: Bullshit!, explaining the thought process of UFO hunters.
