= Principles of grouping =

Perception

The principles of grouping (or Gestalt laws of grouping) are a set of principles in psychology, first proposed by Gestalt psychologists to account for the observation that humans naturally perceive objects as organized patterns and objects, a principle known as Prägnanz. The German term Gestalt in psychological contexts means shape, pattern, configuration. Gestalt psychologists argued that these principles exist because the mind has an innate disposition to perceive patterns in the stimulus based on certain rules. These principles are organized into five categories: proximity, similarity, continuity, closure, and connectedness.

Irvin Rock and Steve Palmer, who are acknowledged as having built upon the work of Max Wertheimer and others and to have identified additional grouping principles, note that Wertheimer's laws have come to be called the "Gestalt laws of grouping" but state that "perhaps a more appropriate description" is "principles of grouping". Rock and Palmer helped to further Wertheimer's research to explain human perception of groups of objects and how whole objects are formed from parts which are perceived.

== Proximity ==
Law of proximity

The Gestalt law of proximity states that "objects or shapes that are close to one another appear to form groups". Even if the shapes, sizes, and objects are radically different, they will appear as a group if they are close.

- Refers to the way smaller elements are "assembled" in a composition.
- Also called "grouping", the principle concerns the effect generated when the collective presence of the set of elements becomes more meaningful than their presence as separate elements. (It also depends on a correct order for comprehension.)
- Grouping the words also changes the visual and psychological meaning of the composition in non-verbal ways unrelated to their meaning.
- Elements which are grouped together create the illusion of shapes or planes in space, even if the elements are not touching.
- Grouping of this sort can be achieved with tone or value, color, shape, size, or other physical attributes.

== Similarity ==
Law of similarity

The principle of similarity states that perception lends itself to seeing stimuli that physically resemble each other as part of the same object. This allows for people to distinguish between adjacent and overlapping objects based on their visual texture and resemblance. Other stimuli that have different features are generally not perceived as part of the object. An example of this is a large area of land used by numerous independent farmers to grow crops. The human brain uses similarity to distinguish between objects which might lie adjacent to or overlap with each other based upon their visual texture. Each farmer may use a unique planting style which distinguishes his field from another. Another example is a field of flowers which differ only by color.

The principles of similarity and proximity often work together to form a visual hierarchy. Either principle can dominate the other, depending on the application and combination of the two. For example, in the grid to the left, the similarity principle dominates the proximity principle; the rows are probably seen before the columns.

== Closure ==
Law of closure

The principle of closure refers to the mind's tendency to see complete figures or forms even if a picture is incomplete, partially hidden by other objects, or if part of the information needed to make a complete picture in the minds is missing. For example, if part of a shape's border is missing people still tend to see the shape as completely enclosed by the border and ignore the gaps. This reaction stems from the mind's natural tendency to recognize patterns that are familiar and thus fill in any information that may be missing.

Closure is also thought to have evolved from ancestral survival instincts in that if one was to partially see a predator their mind would automatically complete the picture and know that it was a time to react to potential danger even if not all the necessary information was readily available.

== Good continuation ==
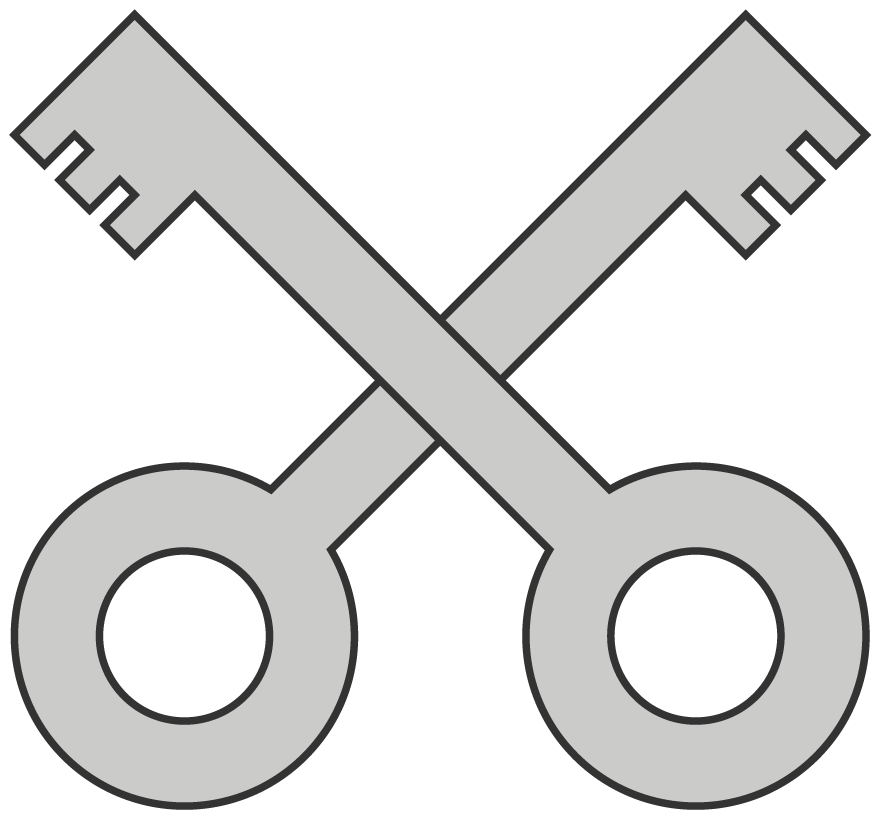
Law of good continuation

When there is an intersection between two or more objects, people tend to perceive each object as a single uninterrupted object. This allows differentiation of stimuli even when they come in visual overlap. Humans have a tendency to group and organize lines or curves that follow an established direction over those defined by sharp and abrupt changes in direction.

== Common fate ==
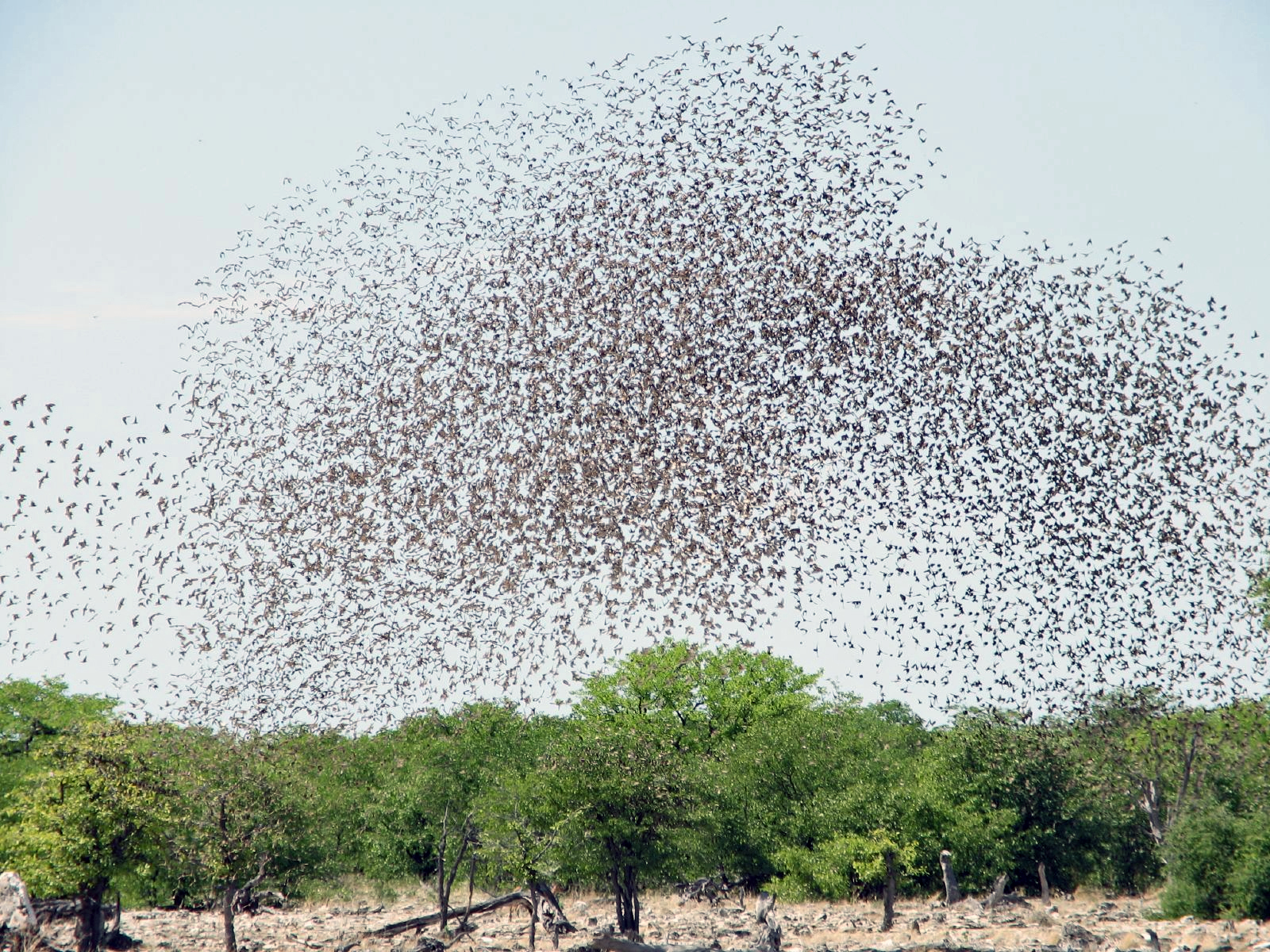
Law of common fate—a flock of birds

When visual elements are seen moving in the same direction at the same rate (optical flow), perception associates the movement as part of the same stimulus. For example, birds may be distinguished from their background as a single flock because they are moving in the same direction and at the same velocity, even when each bird is seen—from a distance—as little more than a dot. The moving "dots" appear to be part of a unified whole. Similarly, two flocks of birds can cross each other in a viewer's visual field, but they will nonetheless continue to be experienced as separate flocks because each bird has a direction common to its flock.

This allows people to make out moving objects even when other details (such as the objects color or outline) are obscured. This ability likely arose from the evolutionary need to distinguish a camouflaged predator from its background.

The law of common fate is used extensively in user-interface design, for example where the movement of a scrollbar is synchronised with the movement (i.e. cropping) of a window's content viewport; the movement of a physical mouse is synchronised with the movement of an on-screen arrow cursor, and so on.

== Good form ==
Principle of good form

The principle of good form refers to the tendency to group together forms of similar shape, pattern, color, etc. Even in cases where two or more forms clearly overlap, the human brain interprets them in a way that allows people to differentiate different patterns and/or shapes. An example would be a pile of presents where a dozen packages of different size and shape are wrapped in just three or so patterns of wrapping paper, or the Olympic Rings.

== See also ==
- Global precedence
- Neural processing for individual categories of objects
- Pattern recognition
- Perception
- Skeuomorphism
- Structural information theory
- Theory of indispensable attributes

== Bibliography ==
- Banerjee, J. C. (1994). "Gestalt Theory of Perception". Encyclopaedic Dictionary of Psychological Terms. M.D. Publications Pvt. Ltd. pp. 107–109. ISBN 978-81-85880-28-0.
- Goldstein, E. Bruce (2009). "Perceiving Objects and Scenes § The Gestalt Approach to Object Perception". Sensation and perception (8th ed.). Cengage Learning. ISBN 978-0-495-60149-4.
- Palmer, Stephen; Neff, Jonathan; Beck, Diane (1997). "Grouping and Amodal Perception". In Rock, Irvin (ed.). Indirect perception. MIT Press/Bradford Books series in cognitive psychology. MIT Press. ISBN 978-0-262-18177-8.
- Palmer, Stephen E. (2003). "Visual Perception of Objects". In Healy, Alice F.; Proctor, Robert W.; Weiner, Irving B. (eds.). Handbook of Psychology: Experimental psychology. Vol. 4. John Wiley and Sons. ISBN 978-0-471-39262-0.
- Weiten, Wayne (1998). Psychology: themes and variations (4th ed.). Brooks/Cole Pub. Co. ISBN 978-0-534-34014-8.
- Wolfe, Jeremy M.; Kluender, Keith R.; Levi, Dennis M.; Bartoshuk, Linda M.; Herz, Rachel S.; Klatzky, Roberta L.; Lederman, Susan J. (2008). "Gestalt Grouping Principles". Sensation and Perception (2nd ed.). Sinauer Associates. ISBN 978-0-87893-938-1. Archived from the original on 2011-07-23.
