= Reginald Golledge =

Reginald George Golledge (born 6 December 1937 in Dungog, New South Wales; died 29 May 2009 in Goleta, California) was an Australian-born American professor of geography at the University of California, Santa Barbara. He was named faculty research lecturer for 2009. He wrote or edited 16 books and 100 chapters for other books, and wrote more than 150 academic papers.

Golledge was a pioneer in the field of behavioral geography. When behavioral geography was divided into a humanistic and an analytical approach by the early 1970s, Golledge became the chief proponent of the latter one. In 1984 he became blind, and moved his focus to the geography of disability. Golledge was one of the developers (the others being psychologists Jack Loomis and Roberta Klatzky) of the UCSB Personal Guidance System.

== Academic career ==
- B.A. (Honors), University of New England (Australia), 1959
- M.A., University of New England (Australia), 1961
- Ph.D., University of Iowa, 1966
- Assistant Professor, University of British Columbia, 1965–1966
- Assistant Professor, Ohio State University, 1966–1967
- Associate Professor, Ohio State University, 1967–1971
- Professor of Geography, Ohio State University, 1971–1977
- Professor of Geography, University of California, Santa Barbara, 1977–2009

== Honors (selection) ==
- Guggenheim Fellow, 1987
- Fellow of the American Association for the Advancement of Science, 1990
- President of the Association of American Geographers, 1999–2000
- Honorary LL.D., Simon Fraser University, 2001
- Honorary Ph.D., University of Gothenburg, 2001
- Fellow of the American Academy of Arts and Sciences, 2005
- UCSB Faculty Research Lecturer, 2009

== Major works ==
=== As co-author ===
- Amedeo, D., & Golledge, R. G. (1975). An Introduction to Scientific Reasoning in Geography. New York: John Wiley and Sons. 2nd printing by Krieger, Melbourne, FL, 1986. ISBN 0-471-02537-2
- King, L. J., & Golledge, R. G. (1978). Cities, Space and Behavior. Englewood Cliffs, NJ: Prentice-Hall. ISBN 0-13-134601-6
- Golledge, R. G., & Stimson, R. (1987). Analytical Behavioural Geography. London: Croom Helm. ISBN 0-7099-3844-6
- Golledge, R. G., & Stimson, R. J. (1997). Spatial Behavior: A Geographic Perspective. New York: Guilford Press. ISBN 1-57230-050-7 / ISBN 1-57230-049-3
- Amedeo, D., Golledge, R. G., & Stimson, R. J. (2009). Person-Environment-Behavior Research: Investigating Activities and Experiences in Spaces and Environments. New York: Guilford Press. ISBN 1-59385-870-1 / ISBN 1-59385-871-X

=== As editor or co-editor ===
- Cox, K. R., & Golledge, R. G. (Eds.). (1969). Behavioral Problems in Geography: A Symposium. Evanston, IL: Northwestern University Press.
- Golledge, R. G., & Rushton, G. (Eds.). (1976). Spatial Choice and Spatial Behavior: Geographic Essays on the Analysis of Preferences and Perceptions. Columbus, OH: Ohio State University Press. ISBN 0-8142-0241-1
- Moore, G. T., & Golledge, R. G. (Eds.). (1976). Environmental Knowing: Theories, Research and Methods. Stroudsburg, PA: Dowden, Hutchinson & Ross. Paperback edition, 1978. ISBN 0-87933-060-0
- Cox, K. R., & Golledge, R. G. (Eds.). (1981). Behavioral Problems in Geography Revisited. New York: Methuen. Translated into Japanese, 1986. ISBN 0-416-72430-2 / ISBN 0-416-72440-X
- Golledge, R. G., & Rayner, J. N. (Eds.). (1982). Proximity and Preference: Problems in the Multidimensional Analysis of Large Data Sets. Minneapolis, MN: University of Minnesota Press. ISBN 0-8166-1042-8
- Golledge, R. G., & Timmermans, H. (Eds.). (1988). Behavioural Modelling in Geography and Planning. London: Croom Helm. ISBN 0-7099-3853-5
- Golledge, R. G., Couclelis, H., & Gould, P. (Eds.). (1988). A Ground for Common Search. Goleta, CA: The Santa Barbara Geographical Press. ISBN 0-00-886090-4
- Gärling, T., & Golledge, R. G. (Eds.). (1993). Behavior and Environment: Psychological and Geographical Approaches. Amsterdam: North Holland, Elsevier Science Publishers. ISBN 0-444-89698-8
- Egenhofer, M. J., & Golledge, R. G. (Eds.). (1998). Spatial and Temporal Reasoning in Geographic Information Systems. New York: Oxford University Press. ISBN 0-19-510342-4
- Golledge, R. G. (Ed.). (1999). Wayfinding Behavior: Cognitive Mapping and Other Spatial Processes. Baltimore, MD: Johns Hopkins University Press. ISBN 0-8018-5993-X
