= Lynette Jones =

New Zealand mechanical engineer

Lynette Anne Jones is a New Zealand mechanical engineer whose research concerns haptic technology, haptic perception, thermal output devices, microsurgery, and the function and mechanics of the human hand and skin. She is a senior research scientist in the Department of Mechanical Engineering at the Massachusetts Institute of Technology.

== Education and career ==
Jones earned bachelors and masters degrees at the University of Auckland in 1976 and 1978. She completed a PhD at McGill University in Canada in 1983.

After postdoctoral research at McGill's Montreal Neurological Institute, she continued at McGill as a researcher and, in 1991, became a tenured associate professor there. She moved to the Massachusetts Institute of Technology as a principal research scientist in 1994, and was named a senior research scientist in 2010.

She was editor-in-chief of IEEE Transactions on Haptics from 2014 to 2019.

== Books ==
Jones is the author of the book Haptics (MIT Press, Essential Knowledge Series, 2018). With Susan Lederman, Jones is coauthor of the book Human Hand Function (Oxford University Press, 2006).

== Recognition ==
Jones was named an IEEE Fellow in 2018, "for contributions to tactile and thermal displays".
