= Theory of indispensable attributes =

The theory of indispensable attributes (TIA) is a theory in the context of perceptual organisation which asks for the functional units and elementary features that are relevant for a perceptual system in the constitution of perceptual objects. Earlier versions of the theory emerged in the context of an application of research on vision to audition, and analogies between vision and audition were emphasised, whereas in more recent writings the necessity of a modality-general theory of perceptual organisation and objecthood is stressed.

The subject of perceptual organisation, and with it TIA, constitute a prime example of how theories of Gestalt psychology have been taken up and kept alive in cognitive psychology.

TIA has been drawn on in the context of music research, in the areas of music philosophy, and systematic music theory.

== Perceptual grouping ==
Since the perception of objects implies a segregation of some parts of the environment (figure) from other parts of the environment (ground), a perceptual system will have to rely on certain features in the environment for the aggregation of what goes together. This aggregation is termed perceptual grouping (PG), and the aim of TIA is the identification of conditions for the occurrence of PG.

PG is considered as a transformation happening between some input and some output. The input $\mathcal{E}$ is considered a set of discrete elements which are distributed over some medium $\mathcal{M}$. Media are also termed indispensable attributes (IA). The output PP is termed a phenomenal partition of $\mathcal{E}$ into subsets, or blocks, E_{1}, E_{2}, ..., E_{m}.

The grouping into some block E_{i} occurs in reference to at least one feature F_{i} from a set of features $\mathcal{F}$. Kubovy and Van Valkenburg (2003) recommend the following expression for the description of a PP: "... the elements of $\mathcal{E}$ spread over $\mathcal{M}$, are grouped by $\mathcal{F}$."

== See also ==
- Auditory scene analysis
- Neural processing for individual categories of objects
- Principles of grouping
- Structural information theory
