= Symmetry breaking (disambiguation) =

Symmetry breaking is a concept in physics.

The term may also refer to:

- a concept in biology: Symmetry breaking and cortical rotation
- a concept in mathematics: Symmetry-breaking constraints
- a concept in animal behavior: Symmetry breaking of escaping ants
- a concept in physics: Landau symmetry-breaking theory
