= BrailleNote =

A BrailleNote is a computer made by HumanWare for persons with visual impairments. It has either a braille keyboard or a Qwerty Keyboard, a speech synthesizer, and a 32- or 18-column refreshable Braille display, depending on model. The "VoiceNote" is the same device without a braille display. The BrailleNote GPS is an 18 or 32 cell BrailleNote with an External GPS module, BrailleNote GPS.

BrailleNote can use only the software provided by the manufacturer, although this can be upgraded.

Use of BrailleNote is suggested by the State University of New York Center for Assistive Technology and is sometimes purchased by colleges for use by disabled students. The BrailleNote product series, introduced in 2000, is regarded as being the first of its kind.

It is possible to obtain a visual interface to the data on a BrailleNote by attaching a computer with a terminal emulator such as Hyperterminal.

== Classic ==
The first "Classic" version of the BrailleNote was released in April, 2000. It used Windows CE 2.12 to Windows CE.NET 4.2 on a MIPS R4000 at 100 MHz Processor.

== PK ==
Introduced in 2004, this small, purse-sized computer has an ARM processor, 40 MB of RAM, 16 MB of Flash, Bluetooth and USB connectivity. This unit also has a Compactflash slot.

== mPower ==
The BrailleNote mPower was introduced in June 2005 and had 128 megabytes of onboard memory and used DiskOnChip memory to avoid losing data if power is lost.

== Apex ==
The BrailleNote Apex, released in November 2009, is a thinner and lighter version of its predecessors. It runs Windows CE 6. It uses the i.MX31 processor. It usually sells for about $5,500 with the 32 Braille cell display.

=== Software and supported formats ===
The Apex's internal software suite is called KeySoft. The current version is 9.5. It includes a word processor, book reader, Web browser, email client, voice recorder, media player, and an XMPP-based IM client called KeyChat (which can also be used with popular non-XMPP protocols such as MSN, but the setup process is complex). The book reader supports English text files (it can convert these to Grade 2 braille automatically if required), Braille ASCII files that specify the dot patterns precisely (these usually have the extension .BRL or .BRF), and audio books including the DAISY format.

=== Connectivity ===
The Apex has Wi-Fi, Bluetooth, and three USB host ports for connecting to printers, embossers, and storage devices. The Apex has a fourth USB port that can be used to connect it to a computer for ActiveSync and for operation as a Braille terminal for the computer. It is capable of interfacing with Bluetooth GPS receivers. Apex has a built-in VGA (monitor) port for viewing information on a monitor. The Apex has removable battery on its underside.

== BrailleNote Touch ==
There are two models of BrailleNote Touch, itself being the newest model in the BrailleNote line. The original, the BrailleNote Touch, was released in spring of 2016. The later version, the BrailleNote Touch Plus, is its more powerful successor, sporting more memory and various improvements to its technical specifications. Unlike earlier versions of BrailleNote, these two models support "touch braille", a system which can be utilized by calibrating the finger positions on the touch screen, and then typing braille normally. It also has a keyboard case which can be attached for classic-style input. The other significant difference between the BrailleNote Touch and Touch Plus and the earlier versions is that the Touch and Touch Plus run android, whereas the earlier versions run Windows CE. KeySoft has been reprogrammed and runs as an accessibility service under android, but can be turned off and on to operate the BrailleNote as if it were a tablet running Android, either with a triple-click of the home button or by holding down the volume keys depending on the model. The BrailleNote Touch and Touch Plus also include KNFB Reader free with the purchase. The included camera is used for optical character recognition, allowing for easy reading of print documents by those with severe blindness.
