= Symmetry =

Mathematical invariance under transformations

Symmetry (left) and asymmetry (right)

A spherical symmetry group with octahedral symmetry. The yellow region shows the fundamental domain.

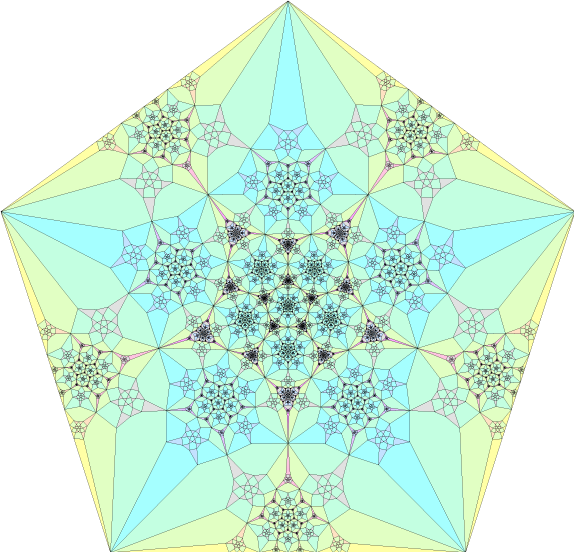
A fractal-like shape that has reflectional symmetry, rotational symmetry and self-similarity, three forms of symmetry. This shape is obtained by a finite subdivision rule.

In everyday life, symmetry (from Ancient Greek συμμετρία (summetría) 'agreement in dimensions, due proportion, arrangement') refers to a sense of harmonious and beautiful proportion and balance. (Note: For example, Aristotle ascribed spherical shape to the heavenly bodies, attributing this formally defined geometric measure of symmetry to the natural order and perfection of the cosmos.) In mathematics, the term has a more precise definition and is usually used to refer to an object that is invariant under some transformations, such as translation, reflection, rotation, or scaling. Although these two meanings of the word can sometimes be told apart, they are intricately related, and hence are discussed together in this article.

Mathematical symmetry may be observed with respect to the passage of time; as a spatial relationship; through geometric transformations; through other kinds of functional transformations; and as an aspect of abstract objects, including theoretic models, language, and music. (Note: Symmetric objects can be material, such as a person, crystal, quilt, floor tiles, or molecule, or it can be an abstract structure such as a mathematical equation or a series of tones (music).)

This article describes symmetry from three perspectives: in mathematics, including geometry, the most familiar type of symmetry for many people; in science and nature; and in the arts, covering architecture, art, and music.

The opposite of symmetry is asymmetry, which refers to the absence of symmetry.

== In mathematics ==
=== In geometry ===
The triskelion has 3-fold rotational symmetry.

A geometric shape or object is symmetric if it can be divided into two or more identical pieces that are arranged in an organized fashion. This means that an object is symmetric if there is a transformation that moves individual pieces of the object, but doesn't change the overall shape. The type of symmetry is determined by the way the pieces are organized, or by the type of transformation:

- An object has reflectional symmetry (line or mirror symmetry) if there is a line (or in 3D a plane) going through it which divides it into two pieces that are mirror images of each other.
- An object has rotational symmetry if the object can be rotated about a fixed point (or in 3D about a line) without changing the overall shape.
- An object has translational symmetry if it can be translated (moving every point of the object by the same distance) without changing its overall shape.
- An object has helical symmetry if it can be simultaneously translated and rotated in three-dimensional space along a line known as a screw axis.
- An object has scale symmetry if it does not change shape when it is expanded or contracted. Fractals also exhibit a form of scale symmetry, where smaller portions of the fractal are similar in shape to larger portions.
- Other symmetries include glide reflection symmetry (a reflection followed by a translation) and rotoreflection symmetry (a combination of a rotation and a reflection).

=== In logic ===
A dyadic relation R = S × S is symmetric if for all elements a, b in S, whenever it is true that Rab, it is also true that Rba. Thus, the relation "is the same age as" is symmetric, for if Paul is the same age as Mary, then Mary is the same age as Paul.

In propositional logic, symmetric binary logical connectives include and (∧, or &), or (∨, or |) and if and only if (↔), while the connective if (→) is not symmetric. Other symmetric logical connectives include nand (not-and, or ⊼), xor (not-biconditional, or ⊻), and nor (not-or, or ⊽).

=== Other areas of mathematics ===
Generalizing from geometrical symmetry in the previous section, one can say that a mathematical object is symmetric with respect to a given mathematical operation, if, when applied to the object, this operation preserves some property of the object. The set of operations that preserve a given property of the object form a group.

In general, every kind of structure in mathematics will have its own kind of symmetry. Examples include even and odd functions in calculus, symmetric groups in abstract algebra, symmetric matrices in linear algebra, and Galois groups in Galois theory. In statistics, symmetry also manifests as symmetric probability distributions, and as skewness—the asymmetry of distributions.

== In science and nature ==
=== In physics ===
Symmetry in physics has been generalized to mean invariance—that is, lack of change—under any kind of transformation, for example arbitrary coordinate transformations. This concept has become one of the most powerful tools of theoretical physics, as it has become evident that practically all laws of nature originate in symmetries. In fact, this role inspired the Nobel laureate PW Anderson to write in his widely read 1972 article More is Different that "it is only slightly overstating the case to say that physics is the study of symmetry." See Noether's theorem (which, in greatly simplified form, states that for every continuous mathematical symmetry, there is a corresponding conserved quantity such as energy or momentum; a conserved current, in Noether's original language); and also, Wigner's classification, which says that the symmetries of the laws of physics determine the properties of the particles found in nature.

Important symmetries in physics include continuous symmetries and discrete symmetries of spacetime; internal symmetries of particles; and supersymmetry of physical theories.

=== In biology ===
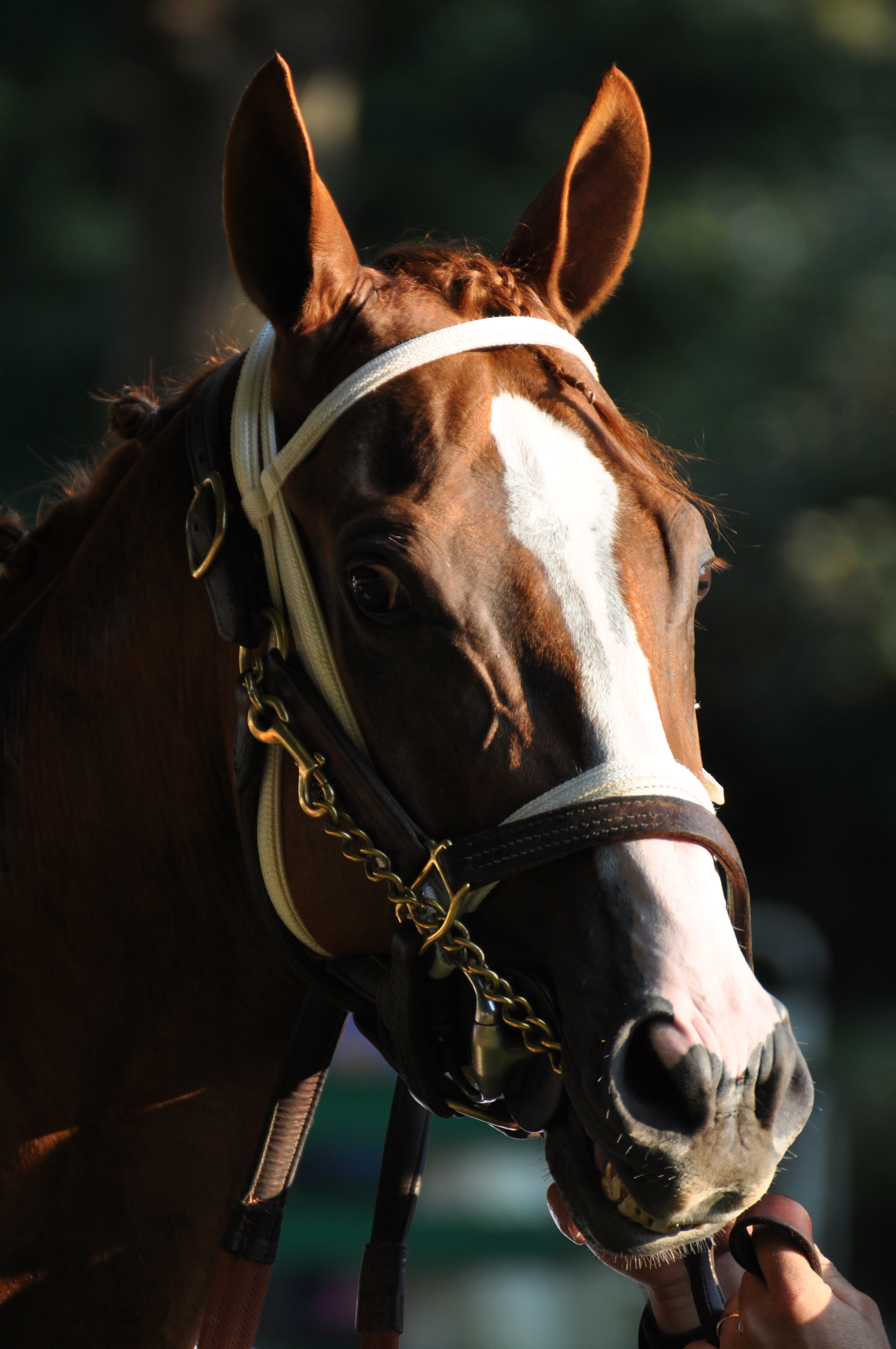
Many animals are approximately mirror-symmetric, though internal organs are often arranged asymmetrically.

In biology, the notion of symmetry is mostly used explicitly to describe body shapes. Bilateral animals, including humans, are more or less symmetric with respect to the sagittal plane which divides the body into left and right halves. Animals that move in one direction necessarily have upper and lower sides, head and tail ends, and therefore a left and a right. The head becomes specialized with a mouth and sense organs, and the body becomes bilaterally symmetric for the purpose of movement, with symmetrical pairs of muscles and skeletal elements, though internal organs often remain asymmetric.

Plants and sessile (attached) animals such as sea anemones often have radial or rotational symmetry, which suits them because food or threats may arrive from any direction. Fivefold symmetry is found in the echinoderms, the group that includes starfish, sea urchins, and sea lilies.

In biology, the notion of symmetry is also used as in physics, that is to say to describe the properties of the objects studied, including their interactions. A remarkable property of biological evolution is the changes of symmetry corresponding to the appearance of new parts and dynamics.

=== In chemistry ===
Symmetry is important to chemistry because it undergirds essentially all specific interactions between molecules in nature (i.e., via the interaction of natural and human-made chiral molecules with inherently chiral biological systems). The control of the symmetry of molecules produced in modern chemical synthesis contributes to the ability of scientists to offer therapeutic interventions with minimal side effects. A rigorous understanding of symmetry explains fundamental observations in quantum chemistry, and in the applied areas of spectroscopy and crystallography. The theory and application of symmetry to these areas of physical science draws heavily on the mathematical area of group theory.

In chemistry, the symmetry of an object or molecule is described using symmetry operations. A symmetry operation is an action that moves a molecule in such a way that its overall appearance remains unchanged. There are three main types of symmetric operations.

1. Rotation

This involves rotating the molecule around an imaginary line called an axis. If the molecule looks the same after the rotation, it is said to have rotational symmetry. Corresponding symmetry element is an axis of rotation.

2. Reflection

This operation reflects the molecule across an imaginary flat surface, like a mirror. If the reflected image is identical to the original, the molecule has reflection symmetry. Corresponding symmetry element is plane of symmetry.

3. Inversion

In this operation, every point of the molecule is moved through a central point to an equal distance on the opposite side. If the molecule remains unchanged after this process, it has inversion symmetry. Corresponding symmetry element is center of inversion or a point.

1. Rotation: Axes of symmetry This axis is commonly denoted as C_{n}, where n indicates the number of times the molecule matches its original appearance during a full 360° rotation. The angle required for each step is 360°/n. If a molecule appears unchanged after rotation by this angle, it is said to have an n-fold axis of symmetry or an axis of order n. The act of rotating the molecule once by 360°/n about this axis is called a C_{n} operation. For example, if a molecule looks the same after a rotation of 120°, it has a C_{3} axis.

A rotation of 360° leaves a molecule exactly the same as it was before the rotation. In this sense, a full rotation is equivalent to a rotation of 0°, meaning no visible change has occurred. In symmetry terminology, the act of making no change at all is called the identity operation, and it is represented by the symbol E. The identity operation is present in all molecules, regardless of their symmetry, because performing no operation always leaves the object unchanged. When a molecule is rotated repeatedly about n-fold axis of symmetry (C_{n}), performing the rotation n times brings the molecule back to its original orientation. This relationship is expressed as C_{n}^{n} = E.

2. Reflections: Plane of Symmetry This plane is represented by the symbol σ(sigma). There are different types of mirror planes, depending on their orientation relative to the molecule. Vertical plane (σ_{v}) is a plane that contains the principal axis of rotation (which is the axis with the highest order or the largest value of n). Horizontal plane (σ_{h}) is a plane that is perpendicular to the principal axis of rotation. Dihedral plane (σ_{d}) is a vertical plane that contains principal axis and bisects the angle between two C_{2} axes that are perpendicular to the principal axis.

If a reflection operation is applied twice, the molecule returns to its original position. This is expressed as σ^{2} = E

3. Inversion: Center of symmetry This operation is represented by the symbol i. Inversion can be thought of as a combination of a 180° rotation followed by a reflection through a plane perpendicular to the rotation axis (σ_{h}). Applying the inversion operation twice returns the molecule to its original configuration: i^{2} = E.

=== In psychology and neuroscience ===
For a human observer, some symmetry types are more salient than others, in particular the most salient is a reflection with a vertical axis, like that present in the human face. Ernst Mach made this observation in his book "The analysis of sensations" (1897), and this implies that perception of symmetry is not a general response to all types of regularities. Both behavioural and neurophysiological studies have confirmed the special sensitivity to reflection symmetry in humans and also in other animals. Early studies within the Gestalt tradition suggested that bilateral symmetry was one of the key factors in perceptual grouping. This is known as the Law of Symmetry. The role of symmetry in grouping and figure/ground organization has been confirmed in many studies. For instance, detection of reflectional symmetry is faster when this is a property of a single object. Studies of human perception and psychophysics have shown that detection of symmetry is fast, efficient and robust to perturbations. For example, symmetry can be detected with presentations between 100 and 150 milliseconds.

More recent neuroimaging studies have documented which brain regions are active during perception of symmetry. Sasaki et al. used functional magnetic resonance imaging (fMRI) to compare responses for patterns with symmetrical or random dots. A strong activity was present in extrastriate regions of the occipital cortex but not in the primary visual cortex. The extrastriate regions included V3A, V4, V7, and the lateral occipital complex (LOC). Electrophysiological studies have found a late posterior negativity that originates from the same areas. In general, a large part of the visual system seems to be involved in processing visual symmetry, and these areas involve similar networks to those responsible for detecting and recognising objects.

== In social interactions ==
People observe the symmetrical nature, often including asymmetrical balance, of social interactions in a variety of contexts. These include assessments of reciprocity, empathy, sympathy, apology, dialogue, respect, justice, and revenge. Reflective equilibrium is the balance that may be attained through deliberative mutual adjustment among general principles and specific judgments. Symmetrical interactions send the moral message "we are all the same" while asymmetrical interactions may send the message "I am special; better than you." Peer relationships, such as can be governed by the Golden Rule, are based on symmetry, whereas power relationships are based on asymmetry. Symmetrical relationships can to some degree be maintained by simple (game theory) strategies seen in symmetric games such as tit for tat.

== In the arts ==
There exists a list of journals and newsletters known to deal, at least in part, with symmetry and the arts.

=== In architecture ===
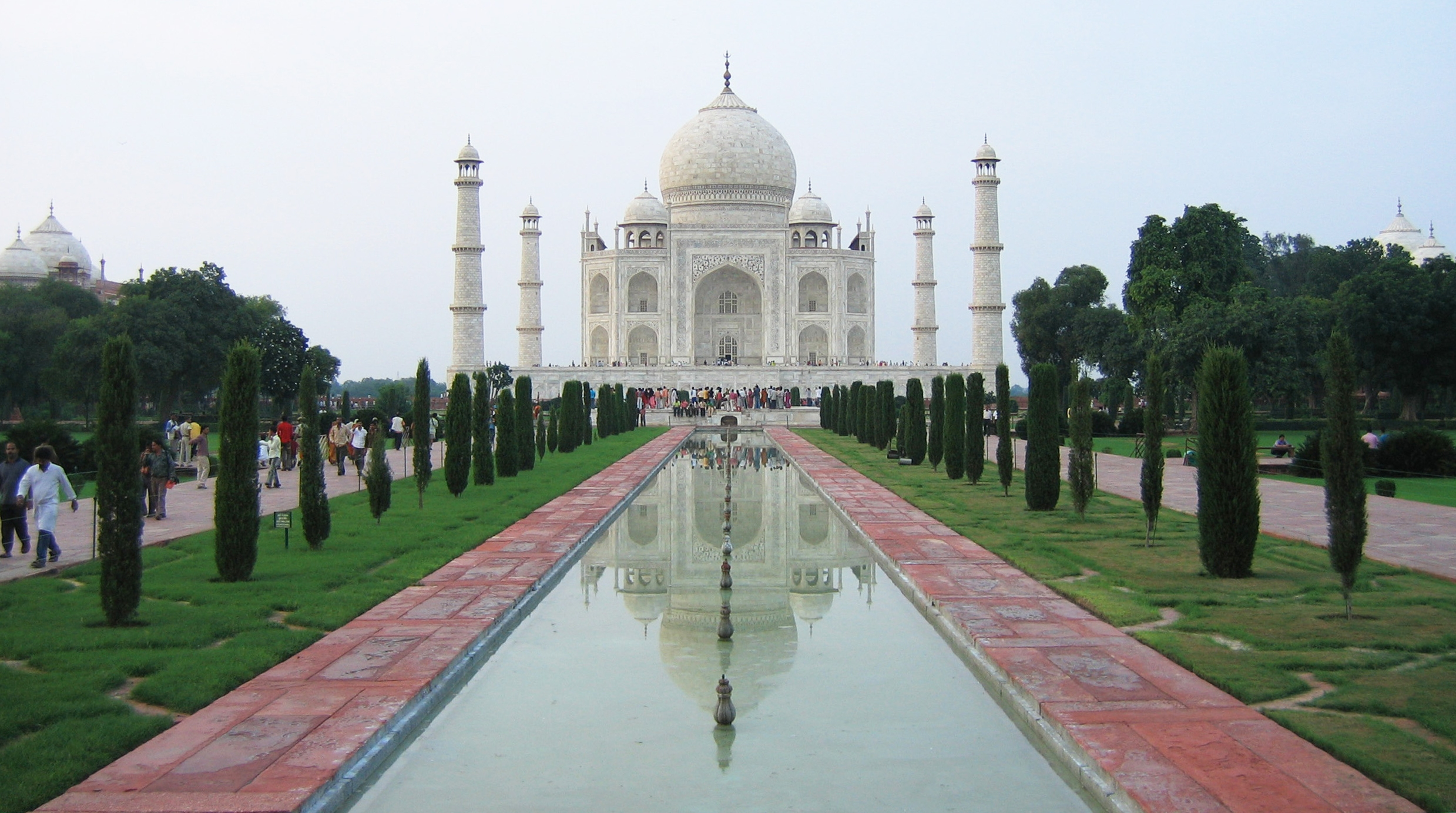
Seen from the side, the Taj Mahal has bilateral symmetry; from the top (in plan), it has fourfold symmetry.

Symmetry finds its ways into architecture at every scale, from the overall external views of buildings such as Gothic cathedrals and The White House, through the layout of the individual floor plans, and down to the design of individual building elements such as tile mosaics. Islamic buildings such as the Taj Mahal and the Lotfollah mosque make elaborate use of symmetry both in their structure and in their ornamentation. Moorish buildings like the Alhambra are ornamented with complex patterns made using translational and reflection symmetries as well as rotations.

It has been said that only bad architects rely on a "symmetrical layout of blocks, masses and structures"; Modernist architecture, starting with International style, relies instead on "wings and balance of masses".

=== In pottery and metal vessels ===
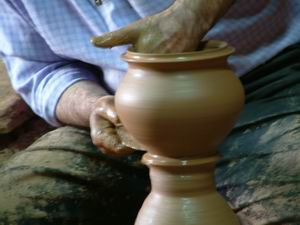
Clay pots thrown on a pottery wheel acquire rotational symmetry.

Since the earliest uses of pottery wheels to help shape clay vessels, pottery has had a strong relationship to symmetry. Pottery created using a wheel acquires full rotational symmetry in its cross-section, while allowing substantial freedom of shape in the vertical direction. Upon this inherently symmetrical starting point, potters from ancient times onwards have added patterns that modify the rotational symmetry to achieve visual objectives.

Cast metal vessels lacked the inherent rotational symmetry of wheel-made pottery, but otherwise provided a similar opportunity to decorate their surfaces with patterns pleasing to those who used them. The ancient Chinese, for example, used symmetrical patterns in their bronze castings as early as the 17th century BC. Bronze vessels exhibited both a bilateral main motif and a repetitive translated border design.

=== In carpets and rugs ===
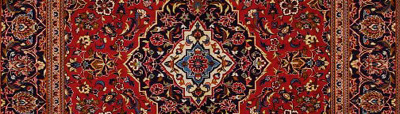
Persian rug with rectangular symmetry

A long tradition of the use of symmetry in carpet and rug patterns spans a variety of cultures. American Navajo Indians used bold diagonals and rectangular motifs. Many Oriental rugs have intricate reflected centers and borders that translate a pattern. Not surprisingly, rectangular rugs have typically the symmetries of a rectangle—that is, motifs that are reflected across both the horizontal and vertical axes (see Klein four-group § Geometry).

=== In quilts ===
Kitchen kaleidoscope quilt block

As quilts are made from square blocks (usually 9, 16, or 25 pieces to a block) with each smaller piece usually consisting of fabric triangles, the craft lends itself readily to the application of symmetry.

=== In other arts and crafts ===
Symmetries appear in the design of objects of all kinds. Examples include beadwork, furniture, sand paintings, knotwork, masks, and musical instruments. Symmetries are central to the art of M.C. Escher and the many applications of tessellation in art and craft forms such as wallpaper, ceramic tilework such as in Islamic geometric decoration, batik, ikat, carpet-making, and many kinds of textile and embroidery patterns.

Symmetry is also used in designing logos. By creating a logo on a grid and using the theory of symmetry, designers can organize their work, create a symmetric or asymmetrical design, determine the space between letters, determine how much negative space is required in the design, and how to accentuate parts of the logo to make it stand out.

=== In music ===
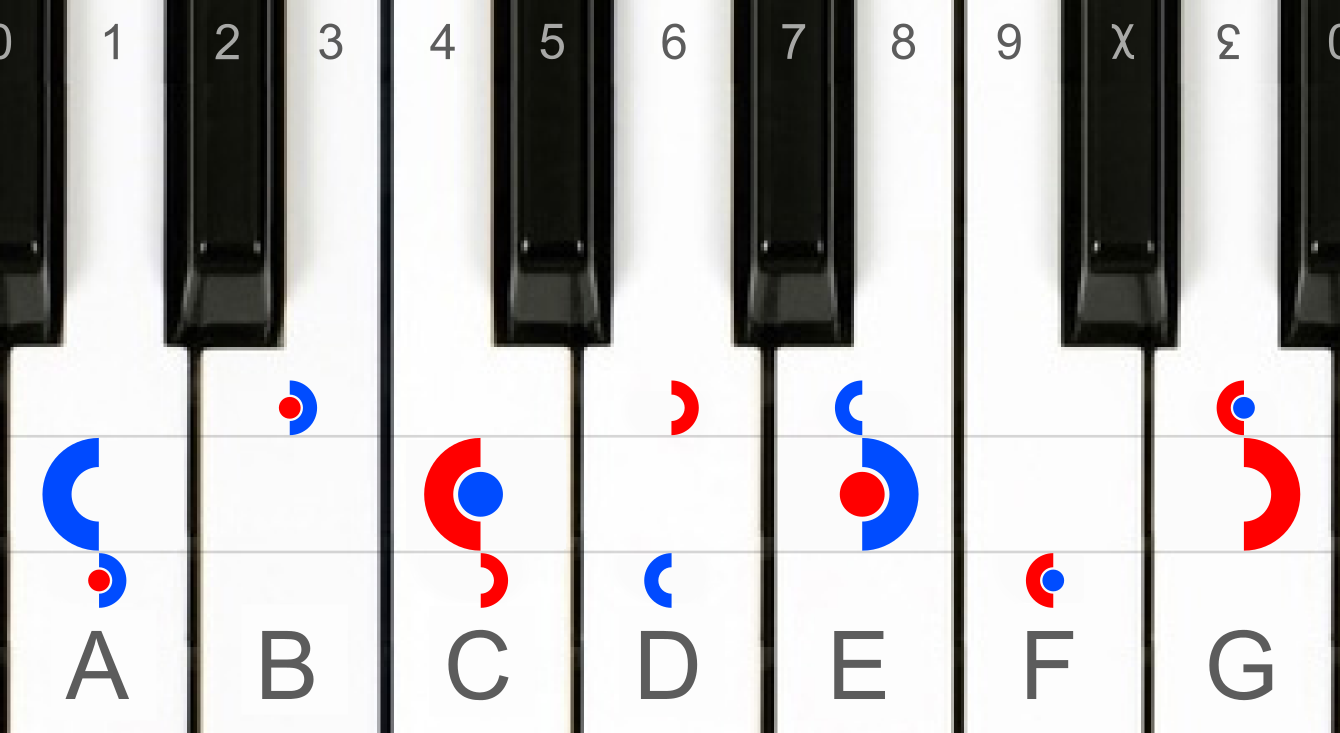
Major and minor triads on the white piano keys are symmetrical to the D.

Symmetry is not restricted to the visual arts. Its role in the history of music touches many aspects of the creation and perception of music.

==== Musical form ====
Symmetry has been used as a formal constraint by many composers, such as the arch (swell) form (ABCBA) used by Steve Reich, Béla Bartók, and James Tenney. In classical music, Johann Sebastian Bach used the symmetry concepts of permutation and invariance.

==== Pitch structures ====
Symmetry is also an important consideration in the formation of scales and chords, traditional or tonal music being made up of non-symmetrical groups of pitches, such as the diatonic scale or the major chord. Symmetrical scales or chords, such as the whole tone scale, augmented chord, or diminished seventh chord (diminished-diminished seventh), are said to lack direction or a sense of forward motion, are ambiguous as to the key or tonal center, and have a less specific diatonic functionality. However, composers such as Alban Berg, Béla Bartók, and George Perle have used axes of symmetry and/or interval cycles in an analogous way to keys or non-tonal tonal centers. George Perle explains that "C–E, D–F♯, [and] Eb–G, are different instances of the same interval … the other kind of identity. … has to do with axes of symmetry. C–E belongs to a family of symmetrically related dyads as follows:"

D	D♯	E	F	F♯	G	G♯
D	C♯	C	B	A♯	A	G♯

Thus in addition to being part of the interval-4 family, C–E is also a part of the sum-4 family (with C equal to 0).

+	2	3	4	5	6	7	8
+	2	1	0	11	10	9	8
+	4	4	4	4	4	4	4

Interval cycles are symmetrical and thus non-diatonic. However, a seven pitch segment of C5 (the cycle of fifths, which are enharmonic with the cycle of fourths) will produce the diatonic major scale. Cyclic tonal progressions in the works of Romantic composers such as Gustav Mahler and Richard Wagner form a link with the cyclic pitch successions in the atonal music of Modernists such as Bartók, Alexander Scriabin, Edgard Varèse, and the Vienna school. At the same time, these progressions signal the end of tonality.

The first extended composition consistently based on symmetrical pitch relations was probably Alban Berg's Quartet, Op. 3 (1910).

==== Equivalency ====
Tone rows or pitch class sets which are invariant under retrograde are horizontally symmetrical, under inversion vertically. See also Asymmetric rhythm.

=== In aesthetics ===
The relationship of symmetry to aesthetics is complex. Humans find bilateral symmetry in faces physically attractive; it indicates health and genetic fitness. Opposed to this is the tendency for excessive symmetry to be perceived as boring or uninteresting. Rudolf Arnheim suggested that people prefer shapes that have some symmetry, and enough complexity to make them interesting.

=== In literature ===
Symmetry can be found in various forms in literature, a simple example being the palindrome where a brief text reads the same forwards or backwards. Stories may have a symmetrical structure, such as the rise and fall pattern of Beowulf.

== See also ==
- Automorphism
- Burnside's lemma
- Chirality
- Even and odd functions
- Fixed points of isometry groups in Euclidean space – center of symmetry
- Isotropy
- Palindrome
- Spacetime symmetries
- Spontaneous symmetry breaking
- Symmetry-breaking constraints
- Symmetric relation
- Symmetries of polyiamonds
- Symmetries of polyominoes
- Symmetry group
- Wallpaper group
