= Geography of disability =

Branch of Human Geography

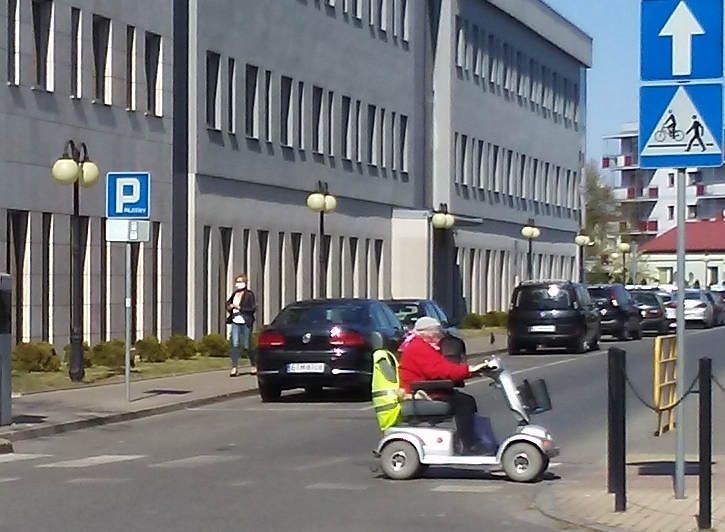
Resource use and infrastructure development are a key community focus. People with physical, mental, or developmental disabilities have historically been left out of this process.

Geography of disability is a multi-disciplinary branch of human geography which studies the experiences of people with disabilities and how much disability within a population can be influenced by the geographical location. Potential aspects include the environment, politics, the level of support in the community and government, and the socio-economic landscape of the region being examined. This field has become increasingly important as policymakers have become aware of the need to ensure equal access to community resources for all individuals, regardless of mobility challenges.

According to the World Health Organization, about 15 percent of the world's population lives with some form of disability. Two to four percent of the disability population struggle with physical mobility. A disability is generally defined as a physical, sensory, or mental impairment that limits at least one life activity. Preventing full participation in currently structured society. The WHO report indicates that poverty, government investment in medical services, and individual access to health care impact disability rates in developed regions. A distinction between impairment and disability is also defined.

== History ==
Research surrounding disabilities has centered around a medical model, in that there is an assumed "able body" for the larger proportion of a population. With this definition, cognitive disabilities were an outlier; one example is hysteria. This perspective has de-emphasized the importance of the person in care, rather than the diagnoses or condition(s) they may have.

During the late 20th century, geographers and sociologists began to adapt the field's understanding of disability from a medical point of view towards a socio-spatial determinant. In 1972, the Union of the Physically Impaired Against Segregation was formed by Lancastrian disability-rights advocate Paul Hunt and the South African writer and activist Vic Finkelstein in the wake of their struggles to remain independent adults while relying on social programmes to provide essential healthcare services.

As the disability rights movement gathered support and gained political victories in a number of industrialized nations during the 1980s and 1990s, sociopolitical discussions also shifted to a more person-centered view of how to support people with disabilities in their communities. As Rob Imrie and Claire Edwards reflected in their 2016 paper, "The Geographies of Disability: Reflections on the Development of a Sub-Discipline",

"... since the mid-1990s, what has emerged has been a broadening of the substantive focus of studies of space and disability, beyond some of the earlier foci of health, cognition and behaviour, welfare, design, and architecture. In particular, the study of disability is evident in most parts of human geography and not just confined to a specialist or sub-part of the discipline."

Simon Williams advocated a new definition of disability in a 1999 paper, calling disability "an emergent property, located, temporally speaking, in terms of the interplay between the biological reality of physiological impairment, structural conditioning (i.e. enablement/constraints) and sociocultural interaction/elaboration". With other nascent sociopolitical movements such as third-wave feminism and environmental justice in the early decades of the 21st century, geographical studies of disability have begun to examine the relationship between disability as a function of socioeconomic status (given the racialization of poverty in many Western nations) and physical, mental, and developmental diagnoses in areas with severe air or water pollution, or poor access to food and housing.

== Models of disability ==
The medical model considers disability a physical problem: an incapability of a disabled person to perform activities of daily living like a non-disabled person. This model focuses on easing inconvenience and improving the daily experience of a person with disabilities, such as advanced assistive devices or mobility aids like wheelchairs for disabled people who live independently.

The social model of disability evokes social integration by demonstrating difficulties faced by disabled people due to their physical or mental functioning differences. This model encourages the mainstream social and cultural structure to accommodate disabled individuals with more assistive infrastructure and improved social attitudes. Children and teenagers with learning difficulties are more likely to experience discrimination, such as rejection by mainstream schools. Youth aged 15–24 with special healthcare needs are ten times more prone to discrimination than disabled adults over age 65. Rob Imrie and Claire Edwards described how geographical-research methodology is used for social research on disabled people:

"Hall and Kearns (2001: 243), for example, comment that 'traditional' research methods, such as questionnaires and interviews, 'can fail to represent the geographical lives of intellectually disabled people' (also, see Hall, 2004). Similarly, a project by Kitchin (2000) about the opinions of disabled people about social research shows that most do not like using methods that fail to capture the complexities of disability. Such methods include pre-set questions that collect quantitative data and statistics. These observations suggest that using particular qualitative or interpretative methods is a preferred way of giving voice to disabled people's experiences and opening up the scope for inclusive research practices. In this respect, some important methodological developments in geographical research seek to articulate the different ways that disabled people know and experience the world."

== Socioeconomic status and disability ==
The logic of disability oppression closely parallels that of other groups. It is bound up with political-economic needs and belief systems of domination.

=== Income ===
Due to the wide range of severity in healthcare needs, many people with disabilities can work part- or full-time with support; those whose needs preclude gainful employment must rely on socialized healthcare programs. Neoliberal governments have sought to limit the growth of entitlement programs, with a common perception that recipients may have "cheated the system." Data from applicants to the Social Security Administration during the 1970s and 1980s indicated that of those who were denied coverage by the program, fewer than half returned to work.

Public-health professionals recognize the need for supportive programs, but may be incentivized by governmental administration or local legislatures to reduce budget costs by weakening services. Social Security in the United States helps more than 20 million program participants to remain above the poverty line, with most in the program within 150 percent of the poverty line. Although median annual income for full-time workers in the United States has grown to over $56,000, the median benefits received annually by Social Security participants is just under $30,000. Similar to workforce financial disparities and pay gaps as a function of race, gender, and age, less than one-fifth of white Americans rely on Social Security for their main income; over 40 percent of Hispanic Americans and one-third of Black Americans do so.

=== Incidence ===
Areas with significant, widespread material wealth will have a high level of development if the wealth is allowed to remain in the community. Poorer urban areas lack the resources to fight illegal pollution, unfair housing practices, and other detrimental community policies which may disproportionately impact them.

During the early 2000s, longitudinal data on the incidence of noninfectious diseases began to indicate the interaction between residence and the risk of developing special healthcare needs or disabilities later in life. U.S. neighborhoods most heavily impacted by redlining had higher incidences of pediatric asthma, lead levels, and obesity. Sixty percent of Hispanic Americans, 50 percent of African Americans, and 33 percent of whites live in areas which fail to meet two or more federal air-quality standards.

==== Public-health data ====
Research on disability by the Australian Institute of Health and Welfare found a strong positive correlation between residence in economically-disadvantaged areas and the probability of acquiring a mild or severe disability. This correlation is also seen in the United States. According to that country's Disability Statistics Annual Report, the distribution of people with disabilities aged 18 to 64 is concentrated in the Southeast (including Georgia, Tennessee, Louisiana and Arkansas). The theory that lower socio-economic status increases disability risk is supported in this region, the most economically disadvantaged in the United States. Another example is Memphis, Tennessee, a city with a poverty rate of 26.2 percent and one of the country's densest disability populations; a reported 12.6 to 17.8 percent of its working population (aged 18 to 64) live with some form of disability. The figures indicated that females were at greater risk of disability than males, regardless of age. According to Eurostat, European women were three percent more prone to chronic health problems and daily activity difficulties than men in 2011.

=== Difficulties in obtaining a diagnosis ===
For many children and adults, a key barrier to supportive services for their healthcare needs is receiving sufficient care to obtain a disability diagnosis. In the United States, the Health Resources and Services Administration have identified Healthcare Provider Shortage Areas: regions in need of more licensed primary, dental, or mental-healthcare providers to support its population.

Harris County, Texas, which includes Greater Houston, needs 75 additional psychiatrists to meet the minimum required ratio of providers to patients in need. Without access to a provider of a diagnosis, patients may not be able to show required documentation to the state or federal agencies who are gatekeepers to social-welfare entitlement programs such as Medicaid and Social Security Disability Insurance. In Australia, this is known as a District of Workforce Shortage. According to 2021 data, nearly 300 districts across Australia have fewer than the national average of psychiatrists (4.6 per 100,000 people). In the United Kingdom, a 2021 study by the Royal College of Psychiatrists indicated that there were about 4,500 full-time psychiatrists to support the country's population of 56.5 million. Canada acknowledges a healthcare-workforce shortage, but has not published specific data on provider numbers. According to data collected from 2017 to 2021, there are over 3,000 speech language pathologists in Ontario (23.5 per 100,000 people) but 423 in Saskatchewan (35.9 per 100,000).

Disability-rights advocates and labor activists have highlighted several causes of this workforce shortage. Chief among them are the cost of schooling (many clinical fields require postgraduate education and training) and the opportunity cost of pursuing an advanced degree when entering a separate field (or private industry) will be more lucrative long-term.

=== Environmental politics of disability ===
A disabled person's origin and living environment, including mobility, accessibility, space and living conditions, determine and impact their daily experience and their physical and mental disorders.

==== Capacity and space ====
Researchers have highlighted the need for a deeper understanding of the relationship between ability and accessibility in public and private spaces. In their 2014 paper, "Disability and Deleuze: An Exploration of Becoming and Embodiment in Children's Everyday Environments", Stephens and Ruddick write that neither space should be seen as solely supportive or un-supportive; every space a child (and later adult) may exist in will vary in support and services.

Given the broad spectrum of physical, emotional, and social capabilities, urban planners and civil engineers have begun to shift design practices for public spaces to incorporate more stakeholder feedback from affected persons or invite discussion on behalf of them. For example, an adult with severe cerebral palsy may be nonverbal and rely on a wheelchair for mobility; carers, family, and friends can provide feedback on private and public projects to best accommodate them.

In recent years, geographers have made significant strides towards understanding the spatiality of disability. This research has presented disability as a population characteristic that inevitably leads to marginalization and spatial exclusion from otherwise normal social arenas and spaces within the built environment. Geographers claimed that throughout the research on the geography of disability, they connected the cause of disability in terms of social and spatial environment and helped the promotion of more accommodating resolutions which "provide access to sites and the full scope of life within society taking different degrees and types of disability into consideration.

— Alina Zajadacz, "The contribution of the geography of disability to the development of 'accessible tourism'"

==== Accessible tourism ====
Accessible tourism derives from the geography of disability. It strives for the right for those with disabilities to participate in tourism and promotes best accessibility practices by engaging representatives of the international tourism sector, disabled individuals, and non-governmental parties. Accessible tourism, which aims to promote "tourism without barriers", has a UNWTO publication. UNWTO has also published a variety of information, including manuals and recommendations on accessible tourism. The geographical model of disability was created during research into the geography of disability.

== Geographies of Disability Hate Crime ==
Areas that are designated for disabled people tend to attract violence due to bystanders knowing disabled individuals will be located in these specific spaces. Disabled individuals face a wide range of harassment in different settings,

"Harassment, name-calling and sometimes violence on streets, in shopping areas and parks, and in local neighbourhoods; harassment near, and damage to, people’s homes, access ramps, gardens and adapted cars; being shouted at and victimised for use of disabled parking spaces at shopping centres and for occupying wheelchair spaces on public transport; verbal abuse and being pushed past in shops, cafes and pubs; abuse in online spaces; being taunted outside care facilities; and abuse, violence and exploitation within institutional care, day centres and individuals’ homes"

A survey was conducted where individuals who experienced hate crime were asked where bad things happen,

"In Medway, Kent (SE England), people with learning disabilities described the following as “where bad things happen”: school, college or day centre (43%); in the street as they were walking somewhere (35%); in and around their home (28%); in their neighbourhood (28%); and on public transport (25%)"

Another study by McClimens et al. in 2014 found that people with learning disabilities had fear about their personal safety which shaped the way they Sheffield city centre,

"Similarly, a study by McClimens et al. (2014) found that fears about personal safety shaped people with learning disabilities’ use of Sheffield city centre: certain places (e.g., near a homeless shelter), certain people (e.g., those begging for money) and certain times (e.g., after dark) made people fearful. As with Pain’s (1997) respondents, no one reported being a victim of crime. Their fears, however, were “real enough” and “they tend to avoid certain places and situations” (McClimens et al., 2014, p. 17). Pain concludes that fear of crime is “an extension of the discrimination and, in some cases, harassment which disabled people may face using urban spaces in everyday life” (1997, p. 241). As such, fear of crime has an arguably greater impact on many more people’s lives than exceptional incidents of violence"

"As Hall and Wilton argue, disabled parking bays, wheelchair spaces on public transport and other such “designated” disability spaces are not necessarily spaces of inclusion. It is the interactions of those using them that make them what they are – if the nature of the encounters within them are commonly negative, as with the above example, such spaces can become exclusionary."

Due to disabled individuals belief that the hate crime they experience will not be taken seriously by the police and others they are reluctant to report it. There are possibilities to reshape the way disability hate crime is addressed and looked at,

"reshape the ways in which the police and local authority agencies interpret and address hate crime, from the current focus on increasing reporting of incidents and prosecutions to prevention strategies, to identify and intervene in spaces and relations where hostility is likely to emerge. More positively, a relational perspective can demonstrate the potential of engendering positive connections and alliances, and spaces, between disabled and non-disabled people to reduce the likelihood of disability hate crime."

== Discrimination in law and policy ==
During the shift to virtual spaces for work and schooling during the COVID-19 public-health emergency in early 2020, a number of disability advocates noted that many disabled workers have been denied telecommuting technology as companies cite cost control. Several countries have enacted policies to address discrimination against people with disabilities. According to a WHO report about disability barriers,

Beliefs and prejudices constitute barriers to education, employment, health care, and social participation. For example, the attitudes of teachers, school administrators, other children, and even family members affect the inclusion of children with disabilities in mainstream schools. Misconceptions by employers that people with disabilities are less productive than their non-disabled counterparts, and ignorance about available adjustments to work arrangements limits employment opportunities.

In Australia, the Disability Discrimination Act 1992 (DDA) prohibits direct or indirect discrimination against a person who is temporarily or permanently disabled or potentially disabled in employment, education, access to services and public places, and purchasing housing.
