= Simon Williams (sociologist) =

British sociologist (born 1961)

Simon J. Williams FAcSS
- Born: 1961 (age 64–65)

Academic background
- Education: Royal Holloway
- Thesis: The consequences of chronic respiratory illness: a sociological study (1990)

Academic work
- Institutions: University of Warwick
- Main interests: Sociology

Simon J. Williams, FAcSS (born 1961) is a British sociologist. He is professor emeritus of Sociology at the University of Warwick.

== Biography ==
Simon Williams completed his doctoral thesis on the sociological dimensions of chronic respiratory illness and disability in 1990 at Royal Holloway and Bedford New College, University of London. He then worked as a Research Fellow at the University of Kent in the Centre for Health Services Studies from 1990 to 1992 before moving to a full-time lectureship in Sociology at the University of Warwick in 1992, where he has been ever since, becoming a full Professor of Sociology in 2006 and Emeritus Professor in October 2019.

== Research ==
Williams' has researched a wide range of sociological topics and interdisciplinary issues during his career, including the body, emotion/affect, health and illness, pain, sleep, pharmaceuticals, and the neurosciences—with particular reference to issues of cognitive enhancement. He also has newly emerging research interests in new digital health technologies, including AI assisted technologies in health and medicine.

== The sociology and politics of sleep ==
Perhaps the most innovative aspect of Williams' work to date has been his contribution to the newly emerging sociology of sleep: a topic which until quite recently has received relatively little attention within sociology or the social sciences and humanities in general. His book Sleep and Society, for example, may be read as an early attempt to sketch the sociological dimensions and dynamics of sleep, including socio-cultural and historical variability in how, when, where and with whom we sleep; changing ideas, meanings and values associated with sleep through time, culture and context; the contested nature and status of sleep rights and sleep roles in the 24/7 society; the embodied and embedded nature of sleep in everyday/night life; the social patterning and social organisation of sleep; and the medicalisation of sleep. Further collaborative research has also been conducted on the social construction of sleep in the news, and sleep deprivation as a hidden dimension of domestic violence.

His latest book, The Politics of Sleep, examines the increasingly 'politicised' nature of sleep today as a matter of controversy, contestation and concern, thereby linking sleep to prevailing socio-political discourses and debates concerning rights, risks and responsibilities in the late modern age and associated questions of citizenship, enterprise and enhancement in neo-liberal times. Sleep indeed, Williams argues, is another vital part of the 'politics of life' and the 'governance of bodies' today.

The social sciences and humanities too, Williams suggests, are implicated in these very processes and dynamics, thereby further profiling, promoting or problematising and hence politicising sleep, both inside and outside the academy, the laboratory and the clinic. This for example, includes recent sociological research on: gender, sleep and the life course; the social and health patterning of sleep quality and duration, and; the medicalisation of sleep. Comparative historical and cross-cultural research is also now shedding further valuable new light on a range of sleep-related matters such as the transformation of sleep science; sleep in (pre)industrial times, and; sleep and night-time in Asia and the West. This research in turn raises important questions as to what 'normal' sleep is, for whom, when and where, thereby further problematising and politicising sleep, past, present and future.

This research adds to a new interdisciplinary area of research on 'sleep, culture and society' that complements and extends existing work in sleep science, sleep medicine and cognate fields of inquiry.

These issues have recently been further discussed and debated online in 'Somatosphere' with the American medical anthropologist Matthew Wolf-Meyer.

Williams' continues to write on these matters, including a forthcoming (co-authored) book on "TechnoSleep: Frontiers, Fictions, Futures." He is also now beginning to write on the social, cultural and political life of chronobiology in society, which includes but extends beyond just sleep matters.

== Honours ==
In September 2014, Williams was elected a Fellow of the Academy of Social Sciences.

== Selected bibliography ==
=== Books ===
- Williams, Simon J. (1993). Chronic respiratory illness. London: Routledge. ISBN 9780203392560.
- Williams, Simon J.; Calnan, Michael (1996). Modern medicine: lay perspectives and experiences. London: UCL Press. ISBN 9781857283181.
- Williams, Simon J.; Bendelow, Gillian (1998). Emotions in social life critical themes and contemporary issues. London New York: Routledge. ISBN 9780203437452.
- Williams, Simon J.; Bendelow, Gillian (1998). The lived body. London New York: Routledge. ISBN 9780203025680.
- Williams, Simon J.; Calnan, Michael; Gabe, Jonathan (2000). Health, medicine and society. London: Routledge. ISBN 9780203463611.
- Williams, Simon J. (2001). Emotion and social theory: corporeal reflections on the (ir)rational. London Thousand Oaks, California: Sage Publications. ISBN 9781280369506.
- Williams, Simon J.; Bendelow, Gillian; Carpenter, Mick; Vautier, Caroline (2002). Gender, health, and healing: the public/private divide. London New York: Routledge. ISBN 9780203996751.
- Williams, Simon J.; Bendelow, Gillian; Birke, Lynda I.A. (2003). Debating biology: sociological reflections on health, medicine, and society. London New York: Routledge. ISBN 9780203987681.
- Williams, Simon J. (2003). Medicine and the body. London Thousand Oaks, California: Sage Publications. ISBN 9781446217795.
- Williams, Simon J. (2005). Sleep and society: sociological ventures into the (un)known. London New York: Routledge. ISBN 9780415354189.
- Williams, Simon J.; Gabe, Jonathan; Davis, Peter (2009). Pharmaceuticals and society: critical discourses and debates. Chichester, UK Malden, Massachusetts: Wiley-Blackwell. ISBN 9781405190848.
- Williams, Simon J. (2011). The politics of sleep: governing (un)consciousness in the late modern age. Houndmills, Basingstoke, Hampshire New York: Palgrave Macmillan. ISBN 9780230223677. Preview.
- Meloni, M, Williams, S.J. and Martin P. (eds) (2016) Biosocial Matters: Rethinking Sociology-Biology Relations in the Twenty-First Century. Oxford: Wiley.Blackwell.

=== Articles ===
- Williams, Simon J. (10 April 2011). "Ideas for modern living: Napping". The Observer. Guardian Media Group. Article for the School of Life series.
