= Neural processing for individual categories of objects =

Discrete categories of objects such as faces, body parts, tools, animals and buildings have been associated with preferential activation in specialised areas of the cerebral cortex, leading to the suggestion that they may be produced separately in discrete neural regions.

Several such regions have been identified within the visual cortex. The fusiform face area (FFA) was first described by Sergent et al.(1992) who conducted a PET (positron emission tomography) study on subjects viewing gratings, faces, and objects. Facial identification exclusively produced increased bilateral activation in the fusiform gyrus, highlighting the dissociation between faces and other object processing. Similar results have also been reported for activation of the parahippocampal place area (PPA) in response to stimuli depicting places and spatial layouts; and in the extrastriate body area (EBA) in response to human body parts.

Studies of patients with brain damage have revealed pure agnosic disorders that selectively impair recognition of specific object categories. Such agnosic disorders have been reported for faces (prosopagnosia), living vs. nonliving stimuli, fruits, vegetables, tools, and musical instruments among others, suggesting that such categories may be processed independently within the brain.

Object-specific areas have been identified consistently across subjects and studies, however their responses are not always exclusive. Martin et al. (1996) found using fMRI that although object-specific responses for tools and animals were found in the left premotor cortex and left medial occipital lobes respectively, identification of both tools and animals produced increased bilateral activation of the ventral temporal lobes. Thus it appears that tools and animals, at least, are not wholly processed by discrete brain areas (despite selective impairment) and alternative theories propose that rather that being object-specific, cortical regions may show preferential activation as a result of greater expertise in one category, greater homogeneity between category members, task-related biases, and attentional preference amongst others.

It may be that the use of distinct brain regions for processing different object categories results from different processing requirements necessary for each class. Indeed, Malach et al. (2002) detail findings that buildings and faces require processing at different resolutions in order to be recognised - face recognition requires the analysis of fine detail, while buildings can be recognised using larger scale feature integration. As a result, faces are associated with central visual field processing while buildings are processed more peripherally. Malach et al. (2002) report that points on the retina sharing foveal centricity are mapped onto parallel cortical bands and it therefore follows that object classes that are processed differently by retinal cells should be represented distinctly within the brain. Consistently, faces and buildings were found to be processed independently of each other and in discrete cortical regions suggesting that processing is facilitated by assigning object categories to distinct cortical regions according to the level and type of processing that they require.

== See also ==
- Cognitive neuroscience of visual object recognition
- Domain specificity
- Face perception
- Functional specialization (brain)
- Modularity of mind
- N170
- Principles of grouping
- Structural information theory
