= Roberta Klatzky =

American psychologist

- Born: January 6, 1947; Duluth, Minnesota

Philosophical work
- School: Perceptual psychology
- Main interests: haptic perception, human-computer interactions
- Notable ideas: The human haptic system is capable of accurate geometric shape perception and object recognition; the UCSB Personal Guided System

Roberta "Bobby Lou" Klatzky is a Professor of Psychology at Carnegie Mellon University (CMU). She specializes in human perception and cognition, particularly relating to visual and non-visual perception and representation of space and geometric shapes. Klatzky received a B.A. in mathematics from the University of Michigan in 1968 and a Ph.D. in psychology from Stanford University in 1972. She has done extensive research on human haptic and visual object recognition, navigation under visual and nonvisual guidance, and perceptually guided action.

Her work has an application to navigation aids for the blind, haptic interfaces, exploratory robotics, teleoperation, and virtual environments. Specifically, alongside Jack Loomis and the late Reginald Golledge, Klatzky played a major part in the development of the UCSB Personal Guided System, a GPS-based navigation system for the blind. The impact of Klatzky's research in psychology and human-computer interaction has been recognized by numerous organizations, and she has been elected as a fellow in the American Psychological Association, the Association for Psychological Science, the Society of Experimental Psychologists and the American Association for the Advancement of Science. She has been awarded the Humboldt Senior Research Award from the Alexander von Humboldt Foundation and the Kurt-Koffka medal from the Justus-Liebig-University of Giessen, Germany. Prior to working at CMU, Klatzky was employed at the University of California, Santa Barbara.

Klatzky is a member of the Center for the Neural Basis of Cognition and the Human-Computer Interaction Institute at CMU. She has also completed editorial work for a number of prestigious journals in cognitive and perceptual psychology, including IEEE, Acta Psychologica and Perception and Psychophysics, and she is listed in Outstanding Scientists of the 20th Century.

== Selected works ==
- Klatzky, Roberta L. (1980). Human memory : structures and processes (2d ed.). San Francisco: Freeman. ISBN 0-7167-1113-3. OCLC 5411656.
- Klatzky, Roberta L.; Lederman, Susan J.; Metzger, Victoria A. (1985). "Identifying objects by touch: An "expert system"". Perception & Psychophysics. 37 (4): 299–302. doi:10.3758/BF03211351. PMID 4034346.
- Lederman, Susan J.; Klatzky, Roberta L. (1987). "Hand movements: A window into haptic object recognition". Cognitive Psychology. 19 (3): 342–368. doi:10.1016/0010-0285(87)90008-9. PMID 3608405. S2CID 3157751.
- Loomis, Jack M.; Klatzky, Roberta L.; Golledge, Reginald G.; Cicinelli, Joseph G.; Pellegrino, James W.; Fry, Phyllis A. (1993). "Nonvisual navigation by blind and sighted: Assessment of path integration ability". Journal of Experimental Psychology: General. 122 (1): 73–91. doi:10.1037/0096-3445.122.1.73. PMID 8440978. S2CID 7707523.
- Klatzky, Roberta L. (1998). "Allocentric and Egocentric Spatial Representations: Definitions, Distinctions, and Interconnections". Spatial Cognition. Lecture Notes in Computer Science. Vol. 1404. pp. 1–17. doi:10.1007/3-540-69342-4_1. ISBN 978-3-540-64603-7.
- Klatzky, Roberta L.; Loomis, Jack M.; Beall, Andrew C.; Chance, Sarah S.; Golledge, Reginald G. (1998). "Spatial Updating of Self-Position and Orientation During Real, Imagined, and Virtual Locomotion". Psychological Science. 9 (4): 293–298. doi:10.1111/1467-9280.00058. ISSN 0956-7976. S2CID 12174376.
- Lederman, S. J.; Klatzky, R. L. (2009). "Haptic perception: A tutorial". Attention, Perception, & Psychophysics. 71 (7): 1439–1459. doi:10.3758/APP.71.7.1439. PMID 19801605.
