= Susan Lederman =

Canadian experimental psychologist

Susan J. Lederman FRSC is a Canadian experimental psychologist. She is a professor emerita in the Department of Psychology at Queen's University in Kingston, Ontario, Canada. She is recognized for her contributions to the field of haptics.

Lederman earned a B.A. from the University of Toronto in 1968; an M.A. from the University of Wisconsin in 1970; and a Ph.D. from the University of Toronto in 1973.

Lederman's research has examined, among other topics, the tactile psychophysics of texture perception, and the haptic processing of objects and faces. She led a research project to design and test the addition of a tactile feature to Canadian banknotes, in order to increase their accessibility to blind and visually impaired users. She was formerly the Associate Editor-in-Chief of the IEEE journal Transactions on Haptics.

== Selected works ==
- Lederman, Susan J.; Klatzky, Roberta L. (1987). "Hand movements: A window into haptic object recognition". Cognitive Psychology. 19 (3): 342–368. doi:10.1016/0010-0285(87)90008-9. PMID 3608405. S2CID 3157751.
- Lederman, Susan J.; Klatzky, Roberta L. (1990). "Haptic classification of common objects: Knowledge-driven exploration". Cognitive Psychology. 22 (4): 421–459. doi:10.1016/0010-0285(90)90009-S. PMID 2253454. S2CID 6619282.
- Lederman, Susan J.; Klatzky, Roberta L.; Chataway, Cynthia; Summers, Craig D. (1990). "Visual mediation and the haptic recognition of two-dimensional pictures of common objects". Perception & Psychophysics. 47 (1): 54–64. doi:10.3758/BF03208164. PMID 2300424.
- Lederman, Susan J.; Klatzky, Roberta L. (1993). "Extracting object properties through haptic exploration". Acta Psychologica. 84 (1): 29–40. doi:10.1016/0001-6918(93)90070-8. PMID 8237454.
- Lederman, Susan J.; Hamilton, Cheryl (2002). "Using Tactile Features to Help Functionally Blind Individuals Denominate Banknotes". Human Factors: The Journal of the Human Factors and Ergonomics Society. 44 (3): 413–428. doi:10.1518/0018720024497646. PMID 12502159. S2CID 22157965.
- Lederman, S. J.; Klatzky, R. L. (2009). "Haptic perception: A tutorial". Attention, Perception, & Psychophysics. 71 (7): 1439–1459. doi:10.3758/APP.71.7.1439. PMID 19801605.

== See also ==
- Canadian currency tactile feature
