= Lobes of the brain =

Parts of the cerebrum

Lobes of the cerebral cortex (right hemisphere view)
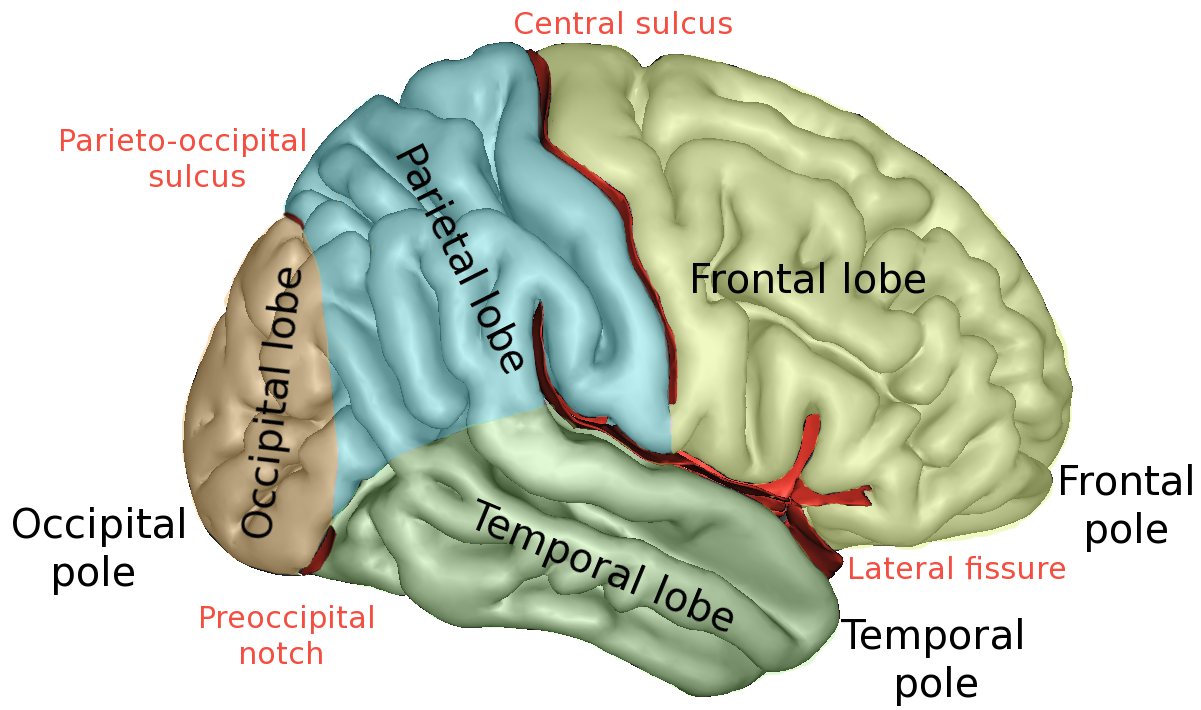
- Lateral surface. Four lobes visible.

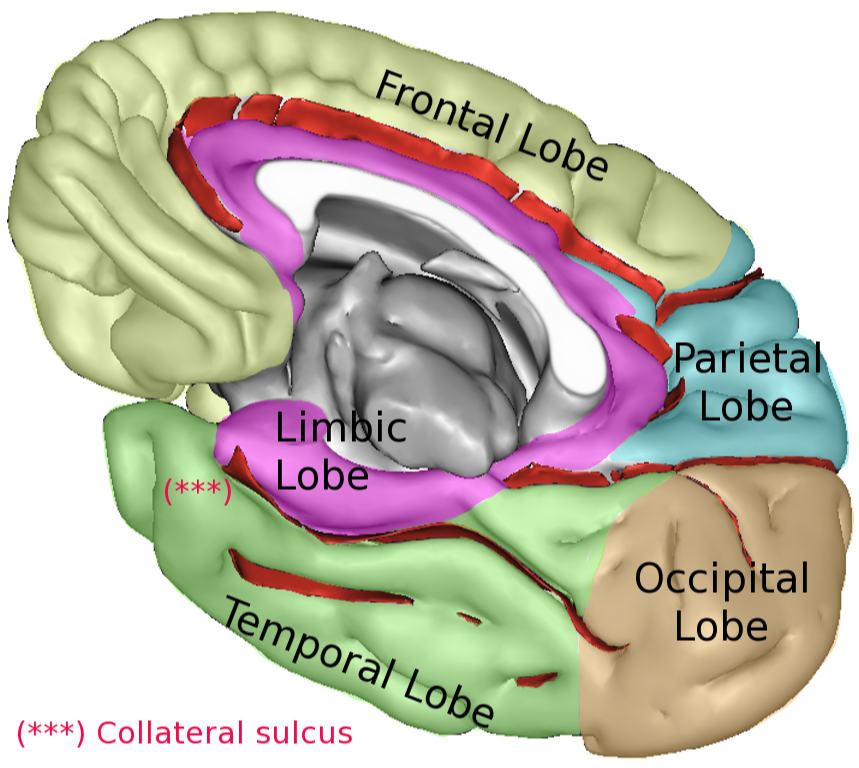
- Medial surface. Five lobes visible.

Identifiers
- NeuroNames: 1210
- NeuroLex ID: birnlex_922
- TA98: A14.1.09.005
- TA2: 5431
- FMA: 77800

The lobes of the brain are the four major identifiable regions of the human cerebral cortex, and they comprise the surface of each hemisphere of the cerebrum. The two hemispheres are roughly symmetrical in structure, and are connected by the corpus callosum. Some sources include the insula and limbic lobe but the limbic lobe incorporates parts of the other lobes. The lobes are large areas that are anatomically distinguishable, and are also functionally distinct. Each lobe of the brain has numerous ridges, or gyri, and furrows, sulci that constitute further subzones of the cortex. The expression "lobes of the brain" usually refers only to those of the cerebrum, not to the distinct areas of the cerebellum.

== Frontal lobe ==
The frontal lobe is located at the front of each cerebral hemisphere and positioned in front of the parietal lobe and above and in front of the temporal lobe. It is separated from the parietal lobe by a space between tissues called the central sulcus, and from the temporal lobe by a deep fold called the lateral sulcus, also called the Sylvian fissure. The precentral gyrus, which forms the posterior border of the frontal lobe, contains the primary motor cortex (area 4 under the Brodmann area architecture) which controls voluntary movements of specific body parts. The precentral region also contains the premotor cortex (Brodmann area 6).

The frontal lobe contains most of the dopamine-delicate neurons in the cerebral cortex. The dopamine system is associated with reward, attention, short-term memory tasks, planning, and motivation. Dopamine tends to limit and select sensory information arriving from the thalamus to the forebrain. A report from the National Institute of Mental Health says a gene variant that reduces dopamine activity in the prefrontal cortex is related to poorer performance and inefficient functioning of that brain region during working memory tasks, and to a slightly increased risk for schizophrenia.

The frontal lobe consists of the prefrontal cortex which is located in the most anterior (farthest away) section of the frontal lobe. It is critical for one's working memory and executive control which helps keep goals and complex tasks organized.

The divisions of the prefrontal cortex include orbital, medial, and lateral prefrontal cortex. Within the lateral prefrontal cortex there are two different divisions: the dorsolateral and ventrolateral prefrontal cortex. The dorsolateral prefrontal cortex is located on top of the ventrolateral prefrontal cortex and is mainly responsible for the executive control and manipulation of memories that are retrieved through episodic memory. The ventrolateral prefrontal cortex is important for the regulation of meaningful stimuli that a person experiences throughout their lifetime, such as images, letters, and names.

Damage to the prefrontal cortex can result in issues with one's long term and short-term memories, as well as create changes in people's behaviors and their abilities to plan and organize.

Damage can result from lesions or tumors that have been surgically removed, and traumatic brain injuries (TBI) experienced from a severe hit to the head causing damage to the brain from swelling. Most often a TBI is experienced within a person's childhood from playing competitive sports or an accident from normal play. Having a traumatic brain injury can increase your chances of developing neurological psychiatric problems and abusing substances, such as cannabis, is known to be a risk factor in developing symptoms associated with schizophrenia. A study found that schizophrenia symptoms (hearing voices, talking to people who were not there, etc.) worsened after the usage of cannabis, suggesting that a TBI from childhood can enhance a development of psychosis due to the changes seen in the white matter within the frontal-temporal areas.

== Parietal lobe ==
The parietal lobe is positioned above the occipital lobe and behind the frontal lobe and central sulcus.

The parietal lobe integrates sensory information among various modalities, including spatial sense and navigation (proprioception), the main sensory receptive area for the sense of touch (mechanoreception) in the somatosensory cortex which is just posterior to the central sulcus in the postcentral gyrus, and the dorsal stream of the visual system. The major sensory inputs from the skin (touch, temperature, and pain receptors), relay through the thalamus to the parietal lobe.

Several areas of the parietal lobe are important in language processing. The somatosensory cortex can be illustrated as a distorted figure — the homunculus (Latin: "little man"), in which the body parts are rendered according to how much of the somatosensory cortex is devoted to them. The superior parietal lobule and inferior parietal lobule are the primary areas of body or spatial awareness. A lesion commonly in the right superior or inferior parietal lobule leads to hemineglect.

== Occipital lobe ==
The occipital lobe is the visual processing center of the mammalian brain containing most of the anatomical region of the visual cortex. The primary visual cortex is Brodmann area 17, commonly called V1 (visual one). Human V1 is located on the medial side of the occipital lobe within the calcarine sulcus; the full extent of V1 often continues onto the posterior pole of the occipital lobe. V1 is often also called striate cortex because it can be identified by a large stripe of myelin, the Stria of Gennari. Visually driven regions outside V1 are called extrastriate cortex. There are many extrastriate regions, and these are specialized for different visual tasks, such as visuospatial processing, color differentiation, and motion perception.

== Temporal lobe ==
The temporal lobe is located beneath the lateral fissure on both cerebral hemispheres of the mammalian brain.

The temporal lobe is involved in processing sensory input into derived meanings for the appropriate retention of visual memories, language comprehension, and emotion association.

Within the temporal lobe is an area of the brain called the hippocampus which is associated with forming new memories and learning new things. The hippocampus has been studied many times in the past for its correlation with epilepsy showing there to be damage of this area. Although it has been difficult to determine the exact link between the temporal lobe and epilepsy, Chauvière (2020) suggests that there is a positive connection between the circuitry reorganization within the neurons and temporal lobe structure impacting rhythmic activities that are important for cognition.

== Limbic lobe ==
The limbic lobe is an arc-shaped region of cortex on the medial surface of each cerebral hemisphere of the mammalian brain, consisting of parts of the frontal, parietal and temporal lobes. The term is ambiguous, with some authors including the paraterminal gyrus, the subcallosal area, the cingulate gyrus, the parahippocampal gyrus, the dentate gyrus, the hippocampus and the subiculum; while the Terminologia Anatomica includes the cingulate sulcus, the cingulate gyrus, the isthmus of cingulate gyrus, the fasciolar gyrus, the parahippocampal gyrus, the parahippocampal sulcus, the dentate gyrus, the fimbrodentate sulcus, the fimbria of hippocampus, the collateral sulcus, and the rhinal sulcus, and omits the hippocampus.

== Insular cortex ==
The insular cortex is a portion of the cerebral cortex folded deep within the lateral sulcus (the fissure separating the temporal lobe from the parietal and frontal lobes). The insular cortex has an important function for sending axons to the amygdala and responding to tones and somatosensory stimulation.

Berret, et al. (2019) used mice to study the fear response that is associated with perceived threats from their memory of previously being shocked on their foot, finding adverse reflex responses in shocking stimulation whenever the insular cortex was silenced. This finding supports that the insular cortex takes information to specific amygdala subdivisions creating different components for fear behaviors.

The insulae are believed to be involved in consciousness and play a role in diverse functions usually linked to emotion or the regulation of the body's homeostasis. These functions include perception, motor control, self-awareness, cognitive functioning, and interpersonal experience. In relation to these, it is involved in psychopathology.

The insular cortex is divided into two parts: the larger anterior insula and the smaller posterior insula in which more than a dozen field areas have been identified. The cortical area overlying the insula toward the lateral surface of the brain is the operculum (meaning lid). The opercula are formed from parts of the enclosing frontal, temporal, and parietal lobes.

== Model images ==
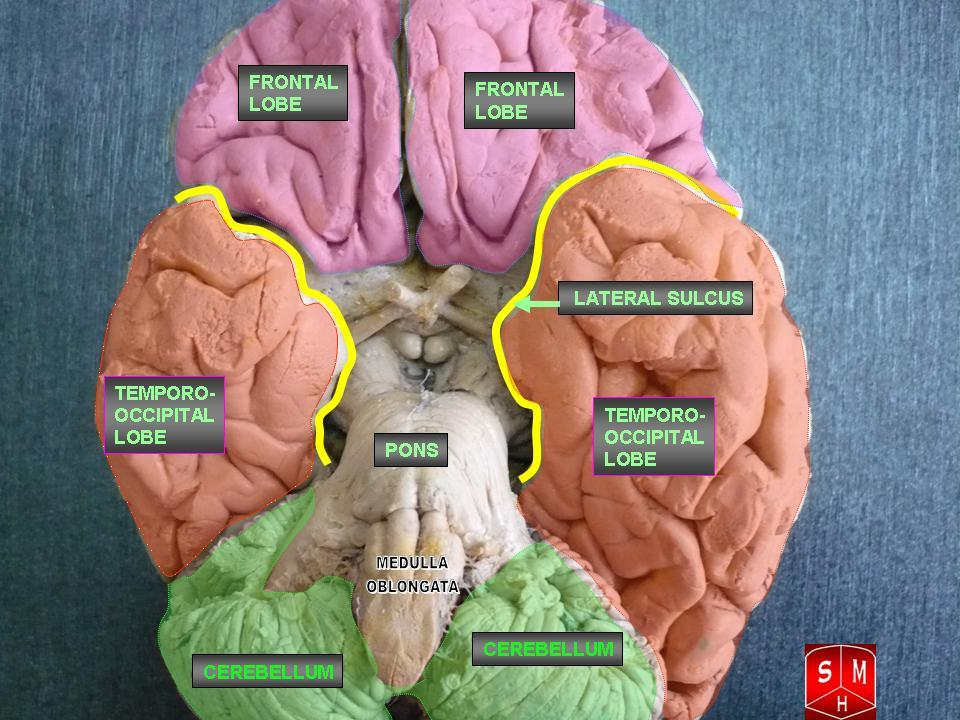
Inferior view of cerebrum.

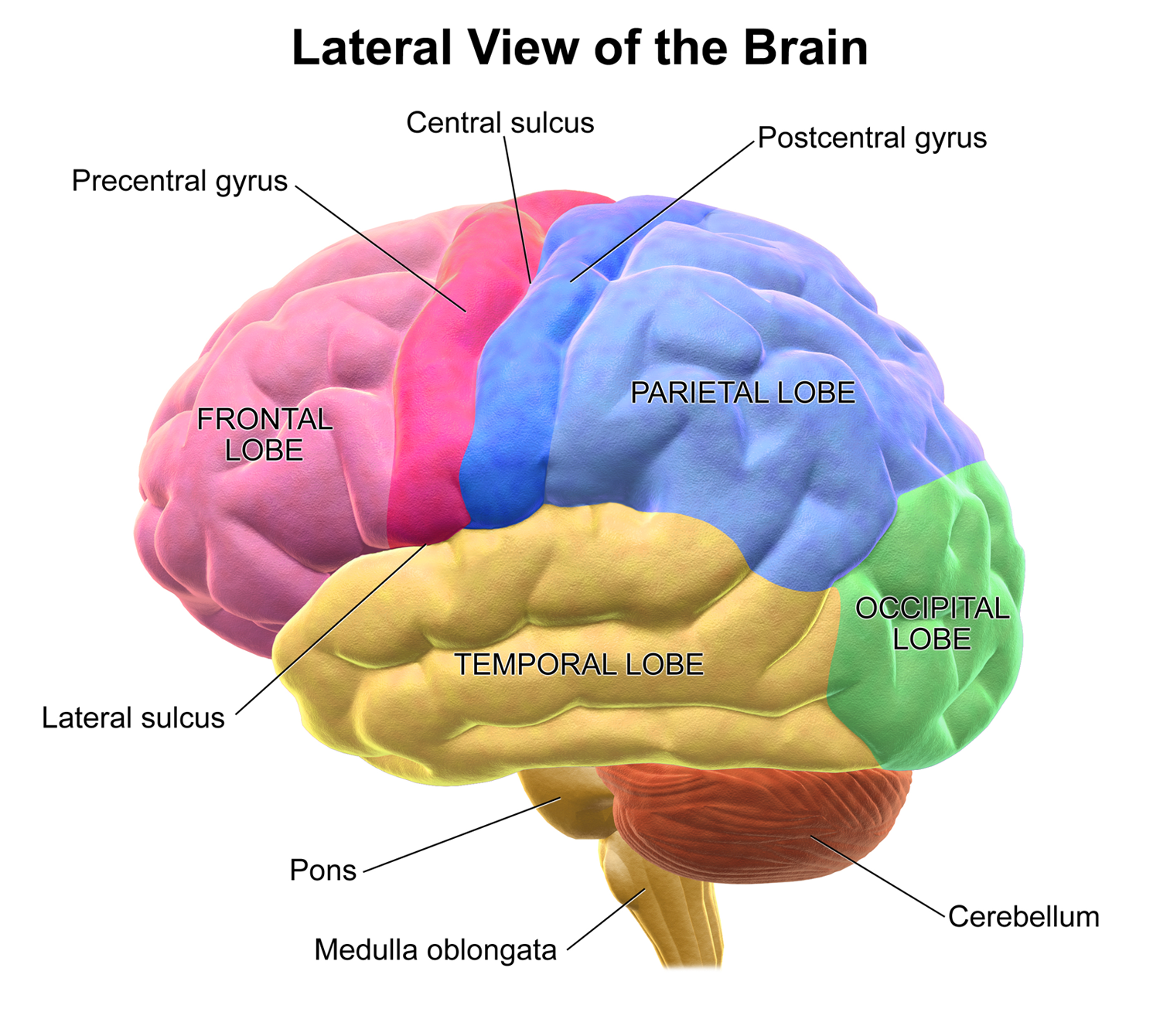
Lateral view of left hemisphere.

Both hemispheres. Left and right lobes are color-matched.
Insular lobe

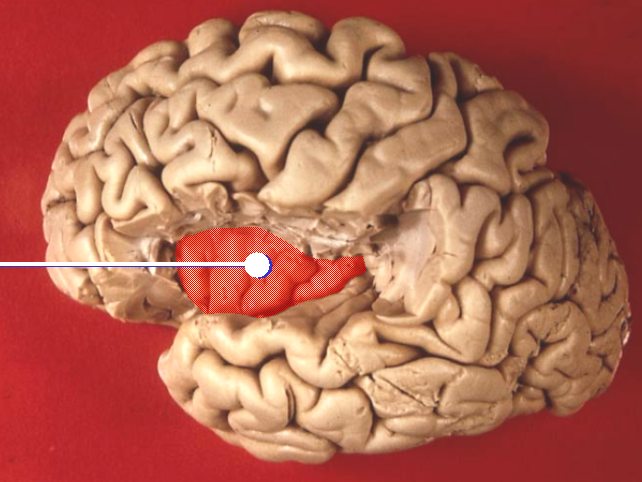
Insular lobe.

Four cerebral lobes and cerebellum:
Occipital lobe
Parietal lobe
Frontal lobe
Temporal lobe

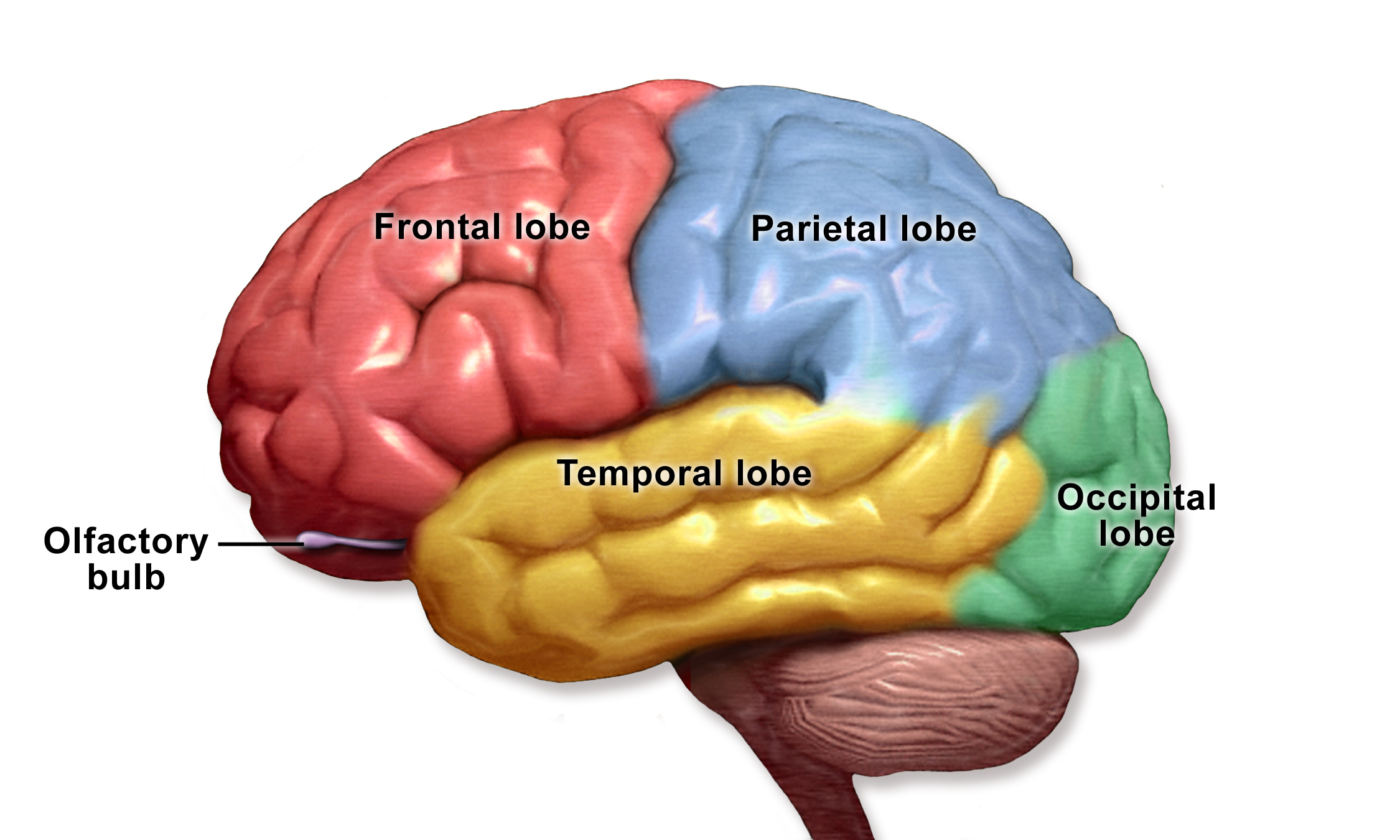
Brain lobes and olfactory bulb.

== See also ==
- List of regions in the human brain
- Neuroanatomy
- Poles of cerebral hemispheres
