= Somatic nervous system =

Part of the peripheral nervous system

- 1. (Brain) Precentral gyrus: the origin of nerve signals initiating movement.; 2. (Cross section of Spinal cord) Corticospinal tract: Mediator of message from brain to skeletal muscles.; 3. Axon: the efferent nerve fiber that carries the command to contract muscles.; 4. Neuromuscular junction: muscle cells are stimulated to contract at this intersection

Details
- Synonym: Voluntary nervous system
- Part of: Peripheral nervous system

Identifiers
- FMA: 9904

The somatic nervous system (SNS), also known as voluntary nervous system, is a part of the peripheral nervous system (PNS) that links brain and spinal cord to skeletal muscles under conscious control, as well as to sensory receptors in the skin. The other part complementary to the somatic nervous system is the autonomic nervous system (ANS).

The somatic nervous system consists of nerves carrying afferent nerve fibers, which relay sensation from the body to the central nervous system (CNS), and nerves carrying efferent nerve fibers, which relay motor commands from the CNS to stimulate muscle contraction. Specialized nerve fiber ends called sensory receptors are responsible for detecting information both inside and outside the body.

The a- of afferent and the e- of efferent correspond to the prefixes ad- (to, toward) and ex- (out of).

== Structure ==
There are 43 segments of nerves in the human body. With each segment, there is a pair of sensory and motor nerves. 31 segments of nerves are in the spinal cord and 12 are in the brain stem. Interneurons, also known as association neurons, are present throughout the central nervous system forming links between the sensory and motor fibres. Thus the somatic nervous system consists of two parts:

- Spinal nerves: They are mixed nerves that carry sensory information into and motor commands out of the spinal cord. The spinal nerves serve as a bridge between the environment and the central nervous system (CNS). These neurons work together to transfer autonomic, sensory, and motor impulses from the spinal cord to the body's other systems. The spinal nerves are arranged into 31 pairs according to the regions of the spinal cord. To be more precise, there are eight pairs of cervical nerves (C1–C8), twelve pairs of thoracic nerves (T1–T12), five pairs of lumbar nerves (L1–L5), five pairs of sacral nerves (S1–S5), and one pair of coccygeal nerves. Peripheral nerves are included in the category of peripheral nervous system.
- Cranial nerves: They are the nerve fibers that carry information into and out of the brain stem. They include smell, eye muscles, mouth, taste, ear, neck, shoulders, and tongue. Partially innervating the head and neck structures are the cranial nerves, which supply afferent and efferent functions. Neural processes connected to certain brainstem nuclei and cortical regions make up cranial nerves, in contrast to spinal nerves, which have neural fibers originating from the spinal grey matter as their roots. The cranial nerves VIII (vestibulocochlear), II (optic), and I (olfactory) are regarded as entirely afferent. The exclusively efferent cranial nerves are XI (spinal accessory), XII (hypoglossal), VI (abducens), IV (trochlear), and III (oculomotor). The remaining cranial nerves, X (vagus), IX (glossopharyngeal), VII (facial), and V (trigeminal), have mixed sensory and motor functions. Anatomically, cranial nerves are numbered from I to XII, which indicates their sequential origin from the caudal to the ventral brainstem. Alternatively, they can be postulated in groups based on the developmental functions they perform (sensory, motor, mixed).

== Function ==
The somatic nervous system's principal function is to facilitate the organs and striated muscles of the central nervous system so that we can carry out our daily responsibilities.

The primary motor cortex, or precentral gyrus, is home to the higher motor neurons that make up the basic motor pathway. These neurons transmit signals to the lower motor neurons in the spinal cord through axons known as the corticospinal tract. These impulses move to the neuromuscular junction (NMJ) of skeletal muscle via peripheral axons after synapsing with the lower motor neurons through the ventral horn of the spinal cord. A signal that travels to the NMJ, which innervates muscles, is produced by the release of acetylcholine by upper motor neurons. Acetylcholine binds to nicotinic acetylcholine receptors of alpha-motor neurons.

The somatic nervous system controls all voluntary muscular systems within the body, and the process of voluntary reflex arcs.

The basic route of nerve signals within the efferent somatic nervous system involves a sequence that begins in the upper cell bodies of motor neurons (upper motor neurons) within the precentral gyrus (which approximates the primary motor cortex). Stimuli from the precentral gyrus are transmitted from upper motor neurons, down the corticospinal tract, to lower motor neurons (alpha motor neurons) in the brainstem and ventral horn of the spinal cord: upper motor neurons release a neurotransmitter called glutamate from their axon terminal knobs, which is received by glutamate receptors on the lower motor neurons: from there, acetylcholine is released from the axon terminal knobs of alpha motor neurons and received by postsynaptic receptors (nicotinic acetylcholine receptors) of muscles, thereby relaying the stimulus to contract muscle fibers.

=== Reflex arcs ===
A reflex arc is a neural circuit that creates a more or less automatic link between a sensory input and a specific motor output. Reflex circuits vary in complexity—the simplest spinal reflexes are mediated by a two-element chain, of which in the human body there is only one, also called a monosynaptic reflex (there is only one synapse between the two neurones taking part in the arc: sensory and motor). The singular example of a monosynaptic reflex is the patellar reflex. The next simplest reflex arc is a three-element chain, beginning with sensory neurons, which activate interneurons inside of the spinal cord, which then activate motor neurons. Some reflex responses, such as withdrawing the hand after touching a hot surface, are protective, but others, such as the patellar reflex ("knee jerk") activated by tapping the patellar tendon, contribute to ordinary behavior.

== Clinical significance ==
A medical condition known as peripheral neuropathy affects the somatic nervous system's peripheral nerve fibers. They can be divided into congenital and acquired disorders based on the causes. They can also be categorized based on whether the myelin sheath (demyelinating neuropathy) or axons (axonal neuropathy) have the predominant disease. There is a wide range of causes for axonal peripheral neuropathy, most of which are toxic-metabolic in origin and include group B vitamin deficiencies and diabetes. Demyelinating neuropathies do not vary with length. They are frequently immune-mediated, which causes a more widespread involvement of sensorimotor function and an early loss of deep tendon reflexes. When joint position and vibratory sensory loss are present, sensory participation is more selective.

Defects in the central nervous system, peripheral nervous system, or muscle itself are the cause of numerous congenital illnesses of sensory and motor function. Owing to the vast territory encompassed by the somatic nerve system, these ailments may manifest as localized in nature, or as broad and systemic. Charcot-Marie-Tooth disease, Myasthenia gravis, and Guillain–Barré syndrome are a few instances of them.

=== Charcot–Marie–Tooth ===
The Charcot–Marie–Tooth disease group comprises diverse hereditary illnesses that manifest as chronic, progressive neuropathy that affects both the motor and sensory neurons.

=== Myasthenia gravis ===
An autoimmune neurological condition called myasthenia gravis is typified by impaired neuromuscular junction communication.

=== Guillain–Barré syndrome ===
A rare but dangerous post-infectious immune-mediated neuropathy is Guillain–Barré syndrome. It is brought on by an autoimmune reaction that destroys peripheral nervous system nerves, leading to symptoms including tingling, weakness, and numbness that can become paralysis.

== Signs of somatic nervous system problems ==
Depending on whether the damage is to the motor nerves, which regulate movement, or the sensory nerves, which affect the senses, the symptoms of a somatic nervous system problem can differ.

Damage to the motor nerves shows as:

- Loss of movement control
- Spasms or cramps in muscles
- Tremors or twitching
- Wasting of muscles (muscle atrophy)

The following signs could be present if the sensory system is damaged:

- Inability to feel things touched
- Numbness or tingling
- Sharp or burning pain in the damaged area

== Other animals ==
In invertebrates, depending on the neurotransmitter released and the type of receptor it binds, the response in the muscle fiber could either be excitatory or inhibitory. For vertebrates, however, the response of a skeletal striated muscle fiber to a neurotransmitter – always acetylcholine (ACh) – can only be excitatory.

== See also ==
- Autonomic nervous system
- Enteric nervous system
- Nervous system
