= Somatotopic arrangement =

Arrangement of the nervous system

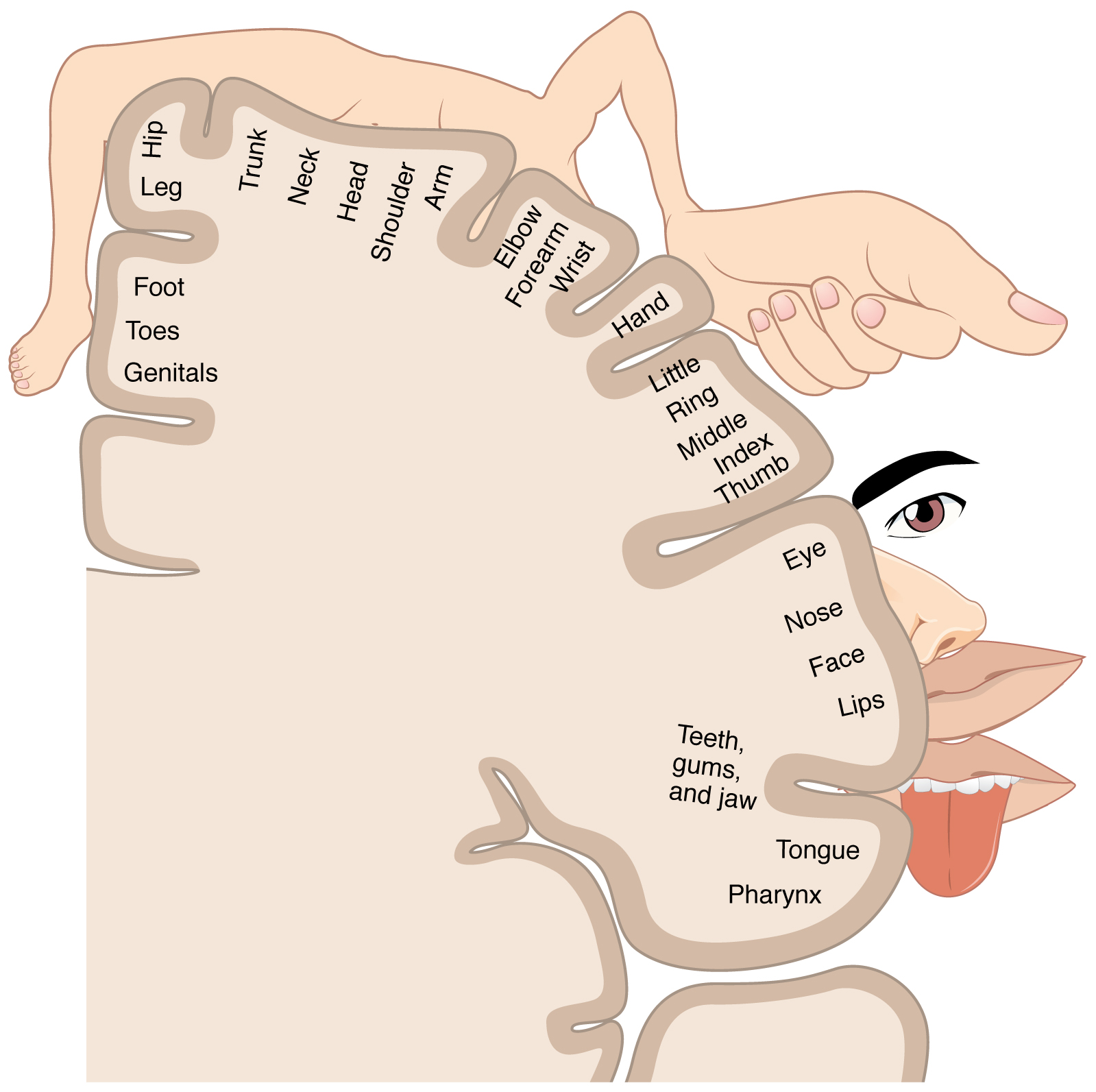
Postcentral gyrus sensory homunculus

Somatotopy (Note: From Greek soma, "body” and topos "place"; thus literally "placing the body". Actually it refers to "placing the body on brain", or point-to-point correspondence of body to brain) is the point-for-point correspondence of an area of the body to a specific point on the central nervous system. Typically, the area of the body corresponds to a point on the primary somatosensory cortex (postcentral gyrus). This cortex is typically represented as a sensory homunculus which orients the specific body parts and their respective locations upon the homunculus. Areas such as the appendages, digits, penis, and face can draw their sensory locations upon the somatosensory cortex. The areas which are finely controlled (e.g., the digits) have larger portions of the somatosensory cortex whereas areas which are coarsely controlled (e.g., the trunk) have smaller portions. Areas such as the viscera do not have sensory locations on the postcentral gyrus.

Macaques, a kind of monkey, already exhibit somatotopy in their somatosensory and motor systems at birth.

== Sensorimotor mapping of the human cerebellum ==
Functional magnetic resonance imaging (fMRI) was employed to determine areas of activation in the cerebellar cortex in humans during a series of motor tasks. The activation areas for movements of lips, tongue, hands, and feet were determined and found to be sharply confined to lobules and sublobules and their sagittal zones in the rostral and caudal spinocerebellar cortex. The activation mapped as two distinct homunculoid representations. One, a more extended representation, was located upside down in the superior cerebellum, and a second one, doubled and smaller, in the inferior cerebellum.

== See also ==
- Cortical homunculus
- Motor cortex
- Motor system
- Retinotopy
- Somatosensory system
- Somatotype and constitutional psychology
- Topographic map (neuroanatomy)
