= Luigi Rolando =

Italian anatomist

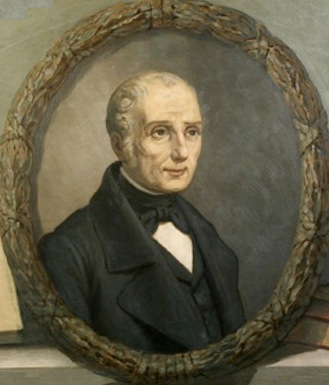
Luigi Rolando

Luigi Rolando (16 June 1773, Turin – 20 April 1831, Turin) was an Italian anatomist known for his pioneering research in brain localization of function.

He studied medicine in Turin, later continuing his education in Florence, where he studied engraving, drawing, anatomical dissection, and conducted microscopic investigations of nerve tissue. From 1804 he was a professor at the University of Sassari, and in 1814 was appointed professor of anatomy at the University of Turin.

As a University of Turin professor, he devoted his life to the study of brain anatomy. A range of neuroanatomical and neurological entities are named after him: the Rolandic vein, the Rolandic artery (central sulcal artery), the pre-Rolandic artery (precentral sulcal artery), the Rolandic operculum (post-central operculum), the Rolandic area (primary motor cortex), the substantia gelatinosa of Rolando, the fissure of Rolando (central sulcus) and Rolandic epilepsy.

== Written works ==
- Saggio sopra la vera struttura del cervello dell'uomo e degli animali e sopra le funzioni del sistema nervoso, (1809) – Essay on the brain structure of humans and animals, and functions of the nervous system.
- Inductions physiologiques et pathologiques sur les differentes espèces..., (translation into French by Antoine Jacques Louis Jourdan, François Gabriel Boisseau), 1822
- Ricerche anatomiche sulla struttura del midollo spinale, (1824) – Anatomical structure of the spinal cord.
- Saggio sopra la vera struttura del cervello e sopra le funzioni del sistema nervoso; Volumes 1–2, 1828
- Manuale di anatomia fisiologica, (1829) – Textbook of physiological anatomy.
- Della struttura degli emisferi cerebrali (1830) – Structure of the cerebral hemispheres.
