= Kerr's sign =

- Differential diagnosis: spinal cord lesion

Kerr's sign is a dermatological sign characterized by a palpable change in skin texture inferior to the somatic level of a spinal cord lesion. The skin may feel stiff, dry, or tense.
