= Motor cortex =

Region of the cerebral cortex involved in voluntary movement

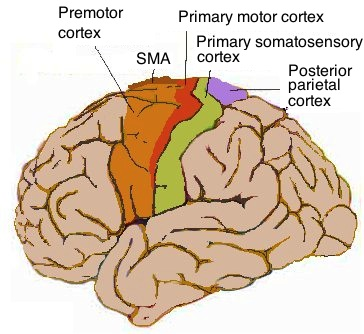
- Topography of human motor cortex. Supplementary motor area labelled SMA.

Details
- Part of: Frontal lobe

Identifiers
- Latin: cortex motorius
- MeSH: D009044
- NeuroNames: 2332
- NeuroLex ID: oen_0001104

The motor cortex comprises interconnected fields on the posterior frontal lobe—chiefly Brodmann area 4 (primary motor cortex, M1) and area 6 (premotor cortex and supplementary motor areas)—that plan, select and execute voluntary movements. These regions transform goals into patterned activity in descending pathways to brainstem and spinal motor circuits, enabling dexterous eye, face and limb actions. Modern work shows overlapping, action‑type representations rather than a strictly point‑to‑point "homunculus", and highlights direct cortico‑motoneuronal projections that underwrite fine finger control. Clinically, motor‑cortical organization shapes deficits after stroke and neurodegenerative disease and guides mapping for neurosurgery and neurotechnology.

== Subdivisions ==
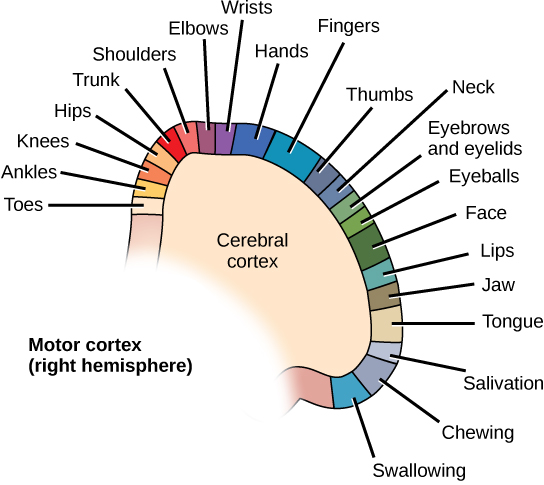
Approximate location of the primary motor cortex on the precentral gyrus of the lateral hemisphere.

Motor cortex is commonly divided into three closely interacting fields:

- the primary motor cortex (M1; Brodmann area 4), which issues descending commands for fine motor control and force production;
- the premotor cortex (lateral area 6), which integrates sensory cues and internal rules to prepare and select actions; and
- the supplementary motor area (SMA; medial area 6), which contributes to internally generated actions, sequential operations, and bimanual coordination.

== Nomenclature and boundaries ==
In classical cytoarchitectonics, Brodmann area 4 (BA4) corresponds to primary motor cortex (M1) occupying the precentral gyrus and the anterior bank of the central sulcus, with medial continuation in the anterior (motor) portion of the paracentral lobule. Its posterior border abuts the primary somatosensory cortex (BA3,1,2) along the lip and wall of the central sulcus; its anterior border is the precentral sulcus where area 6 begins. Receptorarchitectonic work subdivides BA4 into a posterior field (4p) concentrated along the sulcal wall and an anterior field (4a) on the gyral crown. Area 6 lies anterior to BA4 across the superior and middle frontal gyri and includes the lateral premotor cortex; on the medial wall it encompasses the supplementary and pre‑supplementary motor areas.

=== Nomenclature variants ===
Human and non‑human primate atlases differ in labeling schemes across anterior agranular cortex. In macaques, premotor fields are often subdivided into F2/F4 (dorsal/ventral caudal) and F5/F7 (ventral/dorsal rostral), which only partly correspond to human PMd/PMv. In humans, receptorarchitectonic divisions of BA4 into 4a/4p and probabilistic maps derived from imaging produce slightly different borders than gyral/sulcal landmarks, especially near the central sulcus.

=== Primary motor cortex (M1) ===
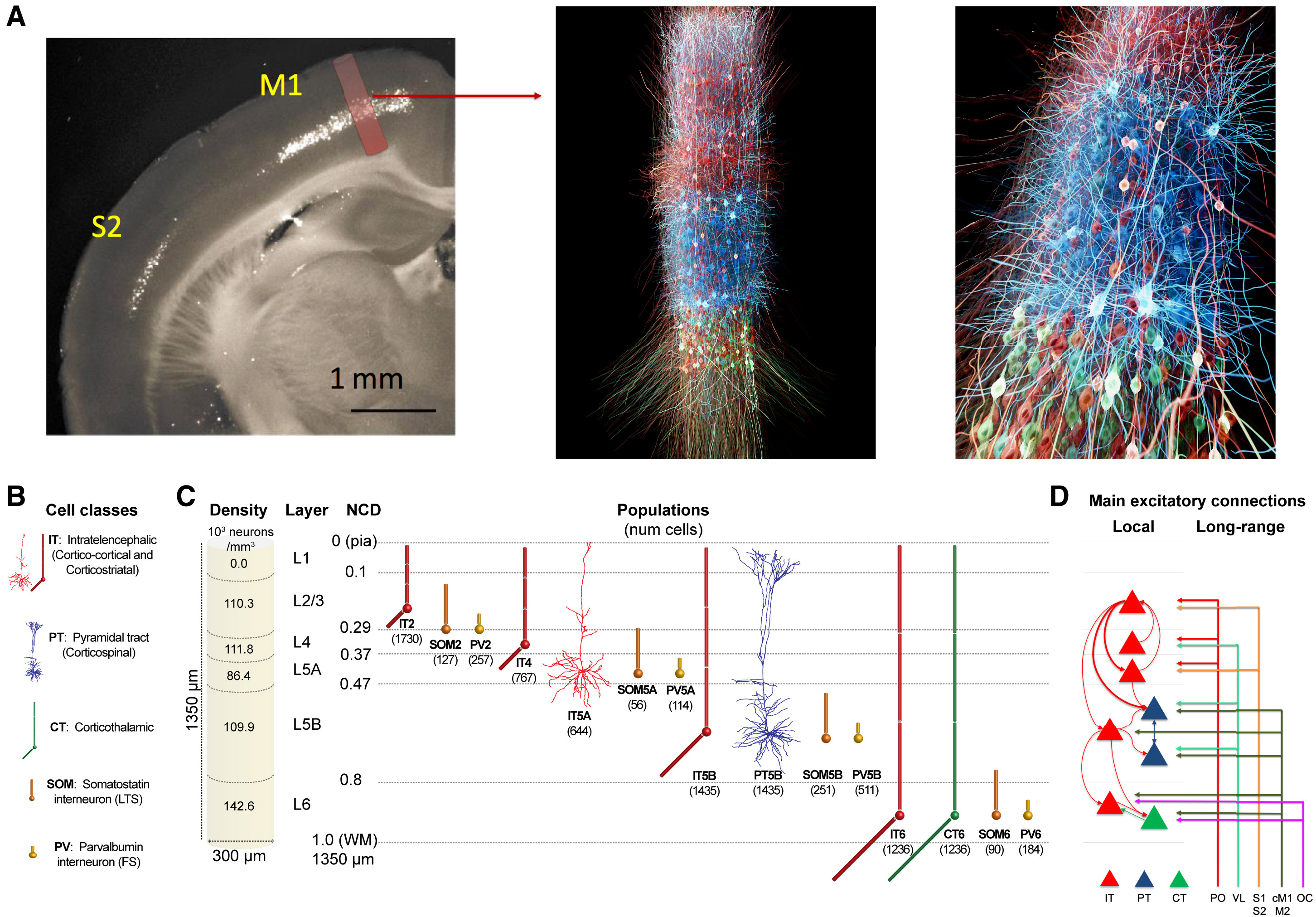
Simplified microcircuit model of primary motor cortex highlighting prominent layer V output neurons (including Betz cells) and their projections.

M1 contains large pyramidal neurons (Betz cells) in layer V and projects densely to spinal and cranial motor circuits via the corticospinal and corticonuclear tracts. Although Betz cells are distinctive, they form only a small proportion of corticospinal outputs; most corticospinal fibers arise from non‑Betz layer V neurons in M1 and from adjacent motor areas.

=== Premotor cortex ===
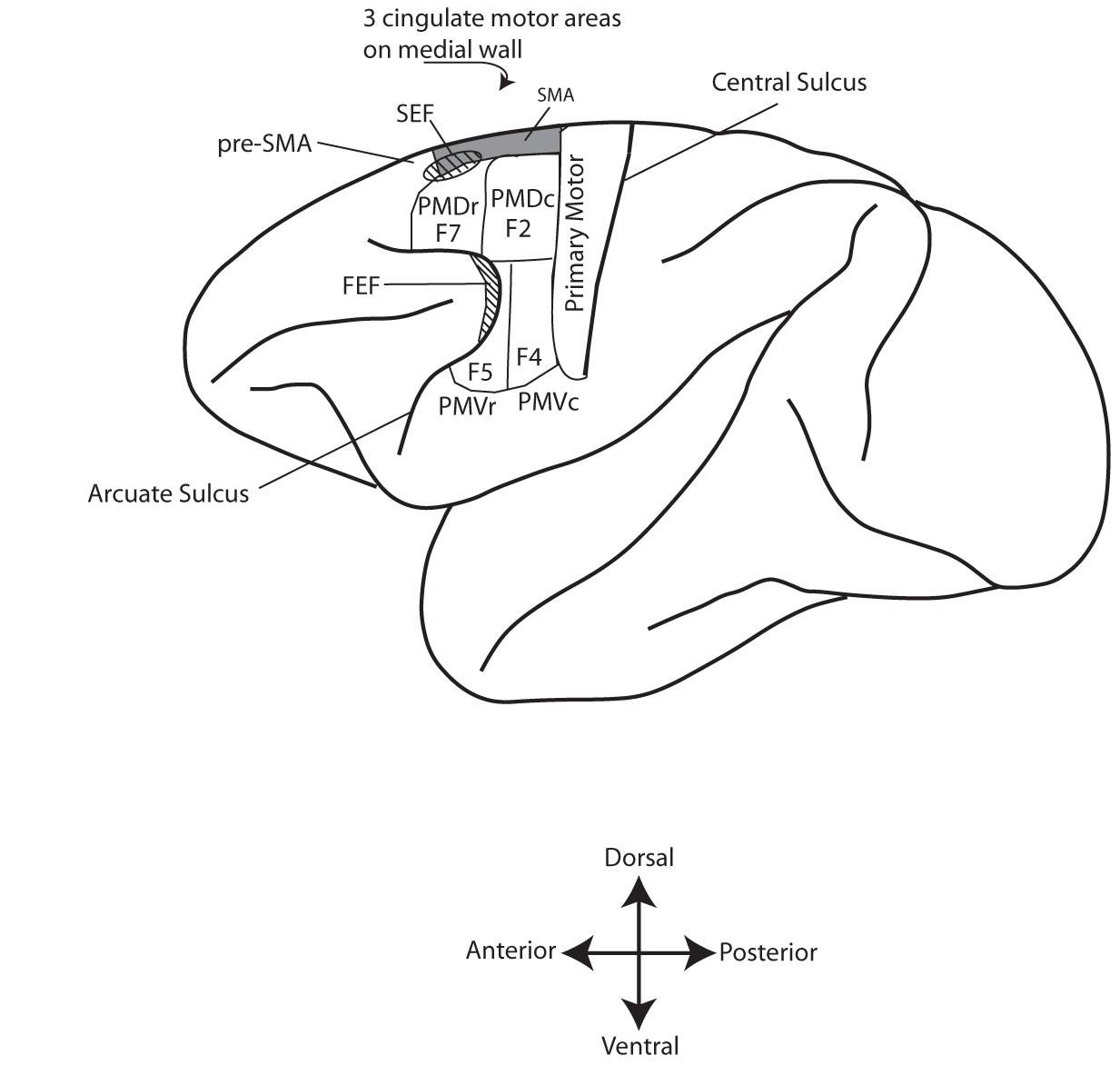
Motor representations in non‑human primate frontal cortex identified with microstimulation and recording (schematic).

Premotor cortex is commonly divided into dorsal (PMd) and ventral (PMv) sectors, each with rostral and caudal parts. PMd contributes to reach planning and selection among competing directions, whereas PMv is heavily involved in shaping the hand for grasp and in multisensory guidance of actions in peri‑personal space. These areas are part of a broader parieto‑frontal system linking dorsal visual streams with motor plans, and their boundaries lie within cytoarchitectonic area 6 lateral to BA4.

==== Mirror‑neuron responses ====
In macaque PMv (area F5), some neurons fire both during execution of a grasp and during observation of the same action performed by others; these "mirror" responses have been proposed to contribute to action understanding and imitation. The extent and function of mirror‑like responses in humans remain debated, but convergent EEG/MEG and fMRI evidence shows action‑observation effects in premotor and parietal circuits that project to M1.

=== Eye‑movement motor fields (FEF/SEF) ===
The frontal eye field (FEF) in the precentral/premotor region and the supplementary eye field (SEF) on the dorsomedial wall form part of the motor network controlling saccades, smooth pursuit and eye–head coordination. FEF receives visual input from occipito‑temporal pathways and projects to the superior colliculus and brainstem gaze centers; SEF participates in internally generated saccade sequences and performance monitoring. Microstimulation of FEF evokes fixed‑vector saccades, whereas SEF stimulation elicits context‑dependent eye movements and sequence effects.

=== Supplementary motor area (SMA) ===
Electrical stimulation and functional imaging implicate SMA in initiating internally generated action and in sequencing. SMA also contains a coarse, overlapping body map and sends direct corticospinal projections. Lesions or inactivation can impair movement initiation and transiently abolish bimanual coordination in non‑human primates.

== Cytoarchitecture and connectivity ==
Motor cortex is agranular isocortex with a six‑layered structure; layer IV is reduced or indistinct, whereas layer V contains the large corticospinal neurons. M1 is sometimes termed area gigantopyramidalis because Betz cells are especially prominent there. Premotor and SMA share a similar laminar pattern but lack Betz cells. Afferent input arrives via thalamic relays conveying basal ganglia and cerebellar output; rich corticocortical connections link PMd/PMv with posterior parietal cortex and SMA with prefrontal cortex. Efferents descend via the corticospinal and corticonuclear tracts and via brainstem motor pathways.

=== Histology ===
M1, premotor cortex and SMA are agranular isocortex. Layer IV is attenuated or indistinct, while layer V contains large pyramidal neurons including Betz cells in M1. Neuron classes include corticospinal and corticobulbar projection neurons, corticocortical pyramidal cells in layers II/III and V, and diverse GABAergic interneurons (basket, chandelier, Martinotti). Cortical thickness varies across the precentral gyrus from the gyral crown to the anterior sulcal wall, paralleling shifts in input/output density and myelination. Betz cells constitute a small minority of corticospinal neurons but have exceptionally thick axons and fast conduction velocities.

== Descending pathways ==
Motor cortical output travels in the corticospinal tract (pyramidal tract) and corticobulbar systems. Fibers originate from multiple fields: approximately one quarter from small pyramidal neurons in M1, substantial fractions from premotor and SMA, and a sizable minority from somatosensory cortex; Betz cells account for only a few percent of corticospinal axons. Many corticospinal terminals contact spinal interneurons, whereas direct cortico‑motoneuronal connections are thought to underlie fine finger control.

=== Orofacial and speech control ===
Corticobulbar projections from lateral M1 and ventrolateral premotor cortex target cranial motor nuclei through relay zones in the pontine and medullary reticular formation. Orofacial, laryngeal and tongue representations occupy the inferior precentral gyrus and adjacent opercular cortex. Direct cortico‑motoneuronal influences on nucleus ambiguus (laryngeal) are sparse in most mammals but appear more substantial in humans and great apes, consistent with fine control of phonation and articulation. Lesions produce dysarthria and apraxia of speech; stimulation studies and functional imaging localize laryngeal motor cortex to a dorsal–ventral pair flanking the central sulcus.

== Motor maps and coding ==
Rather than one‑to‑one control of individual muscles, stimulation and single‑unit studies indicate that motor cortex contains heavily overlapping representations and can specify ethologically relevant, multi‑joint actions. Extended‑duration microstimulation in monkeys evokes coordinated movements such as defensive postures or reach‑to‑grasp sequences, suggesting a map of action types arranged across cortex.

=== Population coding, dynamics and oscillations ===
Population vectors, directional tuning and dynamical‑systems descriptions have been used to account for how ensembles in motor cortex evolve during reach and grasp. Beta‑band (≈13–30 Hz) oscillations increase during hold periods and desynchronize around movement onset; high‑gamma activity scales with force and kinematics in electrocorticography.

=== Readiness potential and pre‑movement activity ===
Scalp and intracranial recordings show a slow negative potential, the readiness potential, beginning up to 1–2 s before self‑initiated movement. Sources include SMA, pre‑SMA and M1, with lateralized readiness potentials reflecting effector selection.

=== Competing frameworks and control principles ===
Several accounts describe how motor cortex specifies movement: (i) muscle‑based coding, in which neurons correlate with muscle activity; (ii) movement‑based coding, emphasizing kinematics/forces of effectors; and (iii) dynamical‑systems views, in which population activity flows along low‑dimensional trajectories that generate movement without requiring an explicit set‑point for each muscle. Optimal feedback control frames motor behavior as task‑level goals stabilized by feedback, with motor cortex participating in a distributed controller.

== Development and plasticity ==
Motor representations are shaped by development and use. Early corticospinal projections are exuberant; activity‑dependent pruning and myelination refine conduction velocity and terminal specificity through childhood and adolescence. Experience can expand or contract cortical zones devoted to particular movements, and recovery after injury may recruit premotor and somatosensory contributions to descending pathways.

=== Maturation of corticospinal systems ===
Transient bilateral projections are common in infancy; progressive myelination, synaptic pruning and strengthening of cortico‑motoneuronal connections accompany the emergence of fine manual dexterity. Diffusion MRI and TMS demonstrate increasing tract integrity and decreasing motor thresholds across childhood and adolescence.

=== Skill learning and reorganization ===
Skill acquisition alters representational geometry in M1 and premotor cortex, biases cortico‑motoneuronal drive toward task muscles, and modifies intracortical inhibition/facilitation. Non‑invasive stimulation (e.g., TMS, tDCS) can transiently modulate learning rates and retention.

=== Lifespan change ===
Aging is accompanied by altered recruitment of premotor and contralateral homologues during motor tasks and by changes in myelination and thickness gradients across precentral cortex; training can partially normalize these patterns.

== Comparative anatomy and evolution ==
Across mammals, corticospinal organization varies with dexterity. Species with skilled, independent finger movements (e.g., humans, macaques) possess abundant cortico‑motoneuronal projections and a prominent M1 “hand knob”, whereas species with less manual dexterity rely more on propriospinal and brainstem pathways. In non‑primates, corticospinal fibers terminate largely on interneurons, while in higher primates many terminations contact motoneurons directly. The distribution and strength of CM projections correlate with the capacity for independent finger movements and tool manipulation.

Tool use and fine object manipulation in primates rely on parieto‑frontal networks linking anterior intraparietal areas with ventral premotor cortex and M1. Expansion of these circuits in humans is associated with increased CM projection density and greater fractional representation of distal musculature, supporting skilled grasp, tool use and praxis.

== Clinical mapping ==
Preoperative and intraoperative mapping reduce morbidity in resections near motor areas. Direct cortical stimulation during awake craniotomy identifies essential sites for movement and speech articulation; subcortical stimulation traces the course of descending fibers. Outside the operating room, transcranial magnetic stimulation (TMS) defines resting motor threshold, motor maps, and intracortical inhibition/facilitation using paired‑pulse protocols.

=== Parameters and safety ===
Intraoperative mapping commonly uses short trains of biphasic or monophasic pulses delivered via bipolar electrodes placed on the cortical surface (typical frequencies ~50–60 Hz; train durations on the order of 1–5 s; currents in the low milliampere range adjusted to evoke responses while avoiding afterdischarges). Mapping proceeds in small spatial steps to delineate essential cortex and white‑matter pathways; electrocorticography is used to monitor afterdischarges, and stimulation is paused or medication given if they arise.

=== TMS metrics ===
Resting motor threshold (RMT) is defined as the minimum stimulator output evoking motor evoked potentials (MEPs) of standard amplitude in a proportion of trials at rest; active motor threshold (AMT) is defined during slight contraction. Paired‑pulse TMS quantifies short‑interval intracortical inhibition and intracortical facilitation, while mapping protocols estimate the areal extent of corticomotor representations.

== Clinical significance ==
Focal lesions of M1 produce contralateral weakness, loss of fine fractionated movements and pathological reflexes, whereas lesions affecting premotor and SMA tend to impair movement initiation, selection, praxis and bimanual coordination. Symptoms reflect the somatotopic bias of affected territories and the crossing of corticospinal fibers in the medullary pyramids.

=== Pathology: ALS and upper motor neuron disease ===
Upper motor neuron signs (spasticity, hyperreflexia, Babinski sign) reflect corticospinal and cortical dysfunction. In amyotrophic lateral sclerosis (ALS), degeneration involves layer V corticospinal neurons as well as spinal motor neurons; neurophysiology often shows corticospinal hyperexcitability early in disease. Imaging and pathology implicate precentral gyrus atrophy and corticospinal tract degeneration.

=== UMN‑dominant syndromes ===
Primary lateral sclerosis presents with progressive upper motor neuron involvement and spastic paraparesis or quadriparesis with relative sparing of lower motor neurons; abnormalities of motor cortex excitability and corticospinal conduction are typical. Corticobasal syndrome features asymmetric apraxia, rigidity and dystonia linked to frontoparietal degeneration; premotor and parietal dysfunction contribute to impaired praxis and alien‑limb phenomena.

=== Stroke and recovery ===
Ischemic injury affecting the precentral gyrus or its descending fibers causes hemiparesis or hemiplegia. Recovery engages perilesional M1, ipsilesional premotor cortex, contralesional homotopic areas and cerebello‑thalamo‑cortical circuits. Task‑oriented therapy and neuromodulation aim to bias adaptive plasticity.

=== Movement disorders and spasticity ===
Abnormal excitability and loss of intracortical inhibition within motor cortex contribute to spasticity, dystonia and task‑specific cramps. Focal cortical dysplasias in the precentral region may cause motor seizures.

=== Apraxia and SMA syndrome ===
Lesions of lateral premotor areas and inferior parietal cortex can produce ideomotor apraxia. Medial wall resections or stroke involving SMA often yield transient akinesia and impaired bimanual coordination (SMA syndrome) with gradual recovery.

== History ==
Electrical stimulation studies by Fritsch and Eduard Hitzig (1870) and by David Ferrier (1870s) first demonstrated a motor representation in cortex. Experiments by Hermann Munk and contemporaries debated sensory vs. motor localization. In the 20th century, intra‑operative stimulation in humans by Penfield and colleagues produced the iconic—though simplified—“homunculus”, while later work emphasized distributed and overlapping motor maps. Contemporary studies integrate microstimulation, single‑unit and population recordings, and neuroimaging to refine these maps.

Early electrical stimulation studies established a cortical motor center: in 1870, Fritsch and Hitzig showed that stimulating parts of dog cortex produced contralateral movements, and Ferrier’s subsequent work in primates mapped a rough dorsoventral progression from leg to face. Clinical stimulation and lesion studies in humans, popularized by Penfield mid‑20th century, refined the human somatotopic picture and its limits.

Debate over field boundaries (area 4 vs. area 6) persisted into the 20th century; by the 1930s–1950s a consensus emerged that cytoarchitectonic area 4 (M1) and area 6 (premotor/SMA) are functionally distinct but connected fields with partly overlapping descending outputs.

Contemporary work divides the premotor cortex into dorsal and ventral sectors, each with rostral and caudal parts (PMDr, PMDc, PMVr, PMVc), largely based on architectonic, connectivity, and stimulation criteria in macaques. PMDc neurons are strongly engaged during reach preparation and execution, and microstimulation there can evoke coordinated shoulder–arm–hand movements resembling reaching. PMVr (classically F5) contains grasp‑related neurons and was the original site where “mirror” discharge was described in macaques; electrical stimulation on behavioral time scales in precentral regions can elicit complex, ethologically meaningful actions (e.g., defensive and hand‑to‑mouth sequences), underscoring that motor fields encode coordinated actions rather than single muscles.

== Research and neurotechnology ==
Recordings from motor cortex have been used to control external devices in proof‑of‑concept brain–computer interface (BCI) studies in humans with tetraplegia, demonstrating real‑time control of cursors and robotic limbs.

=== Methods of study ===
Motor cortex has been investigated with lesions, electrical stimulation, intracortical microstimulation, single‑unit and local field recordings, electrocorticography, MEG/EEG, fMRI, TMS/tDCS and pharmacologic perturbations. Each technique samples different spatial and temporal scales and has distinct interpretive limits.

==== Methodological limitations ====
Spatial precision, sampling, and signal‑to‑noise differ markedly across modalities (e.g., fMRI’s indirect hemodynamic signal vs. ECoG’s high‑temporal‑resolution field potentials). Mapping results depend on behavioral context and analysis assumptions; causal inference generally requires stimulation or lesion methods. Non‑invasive stimulation has safety and interpretive constraints summarized in consensus guidance.

== See also ==
- Corticospinal tract
- Basal ganglia
- Cerebellum
