= Brodmann area 4 =

Region of the brain's frontal lobe; the primary motor cortex

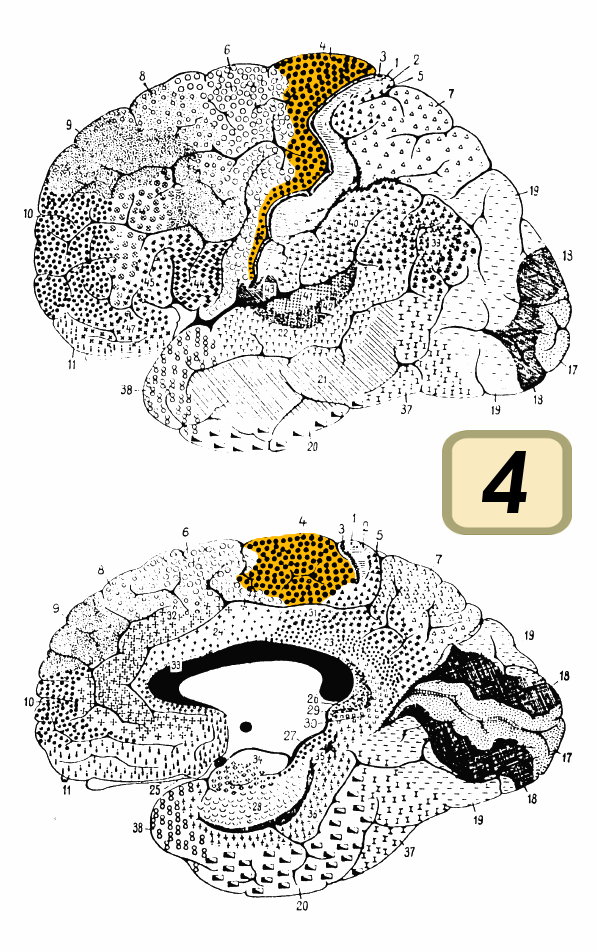
- Brodmann area 4 (orange)

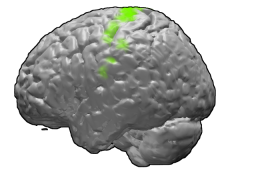
- Brodmann area 4 of human brain.

Details
- Part of: Precentral gyrus

Identifiers
- Latin: area gigantopyramidalis
- NeuroNames: 2394, 1014
- NeuroLex ID: birnlex_1735
- FMA: 68600

Brodmann area 4 refers to the primary motor cortex of the human brain, one of the Brodmann areas. It is located in the posterior portion of the frontal lobe.

Brodmann area 4 is part of the precentral gyrus. The borders of this area are: the precentral sulcus in front (anteriorly), the medial longitudinal fissure at the top (medially), the central sulcus in back (posteriorly), and the lateral sulcus along the bottom (laterally).

This area of cortex, as shown by Wilder Penfield and others, has the pattern of a homunculus. That is, the legs and trunk fold over the midline; the arms and hands are along the middle of the area shown here; and the face is near the bottom of the figure. Because Brodmann area 4 is in the same general location as primary motor cortex, the homunculus here is called the motor homunculus.

The term area 4 of Brodmann-1909 refers to a cytoarchitecturally defined portion of the frontal lobe of the guenon. It is located predominantly in the precentral gyrus. Brodmann-1909 regarded it as topographically and cytoarchitecturally homologous to the human gigantopyramidal area 4 and noted that it occupies a much greater fraction of the frontal lobe in the monkey than in the human.

Distinctive features (Brodmann-1905): the cortex is unusually thick; the layers are not distinct; the cells are relatively sparsely distributed; giant pyramidal (Betz) cells are present in the internal pyramidal layer (V); lack of an internal granular layer (IV) such that the boundary between the external pyramidal layer (III) and the internal pyramidal layer (V) is indistinct; lack of a distinct external granular layer (II); a gradual transition from the multiform layer (VI) to the subcortical white matter.

== Image ==
Animation.

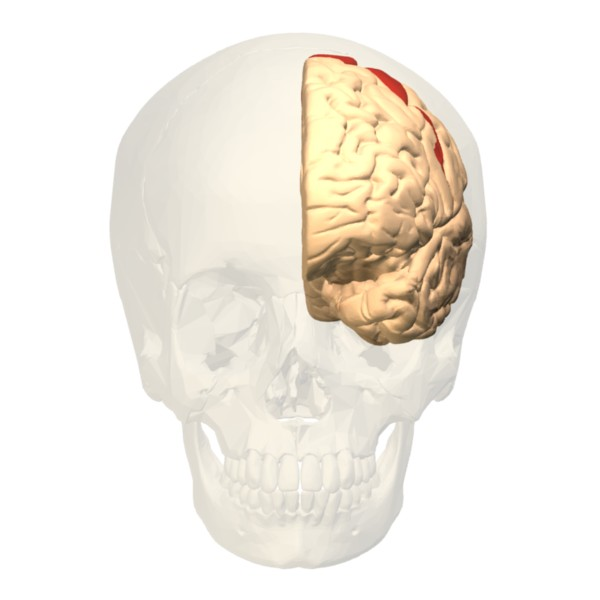
front view.

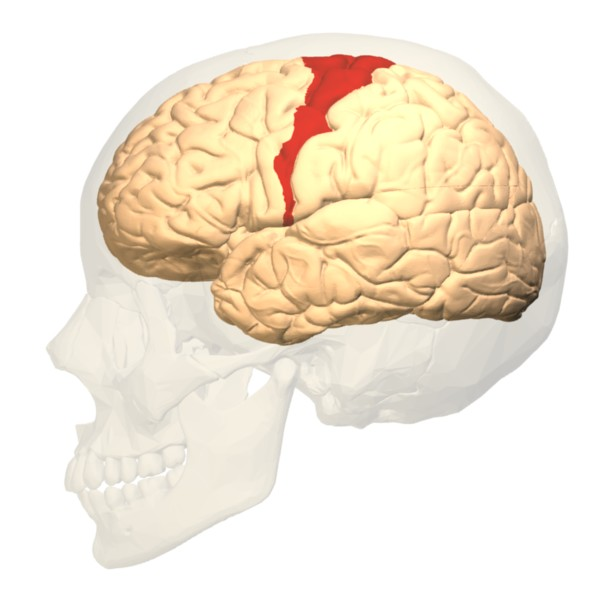
Lateral view.

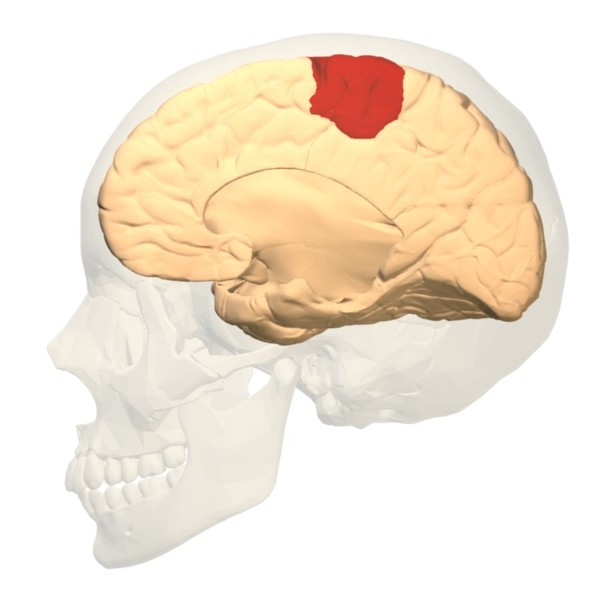
Medial view.

Lateral surface.

== See also ==
- Brodmann area
- List of regions in the human brain
