= Precentral gyrus =

Motor gyrus of the posterior frontal lobe of the brain

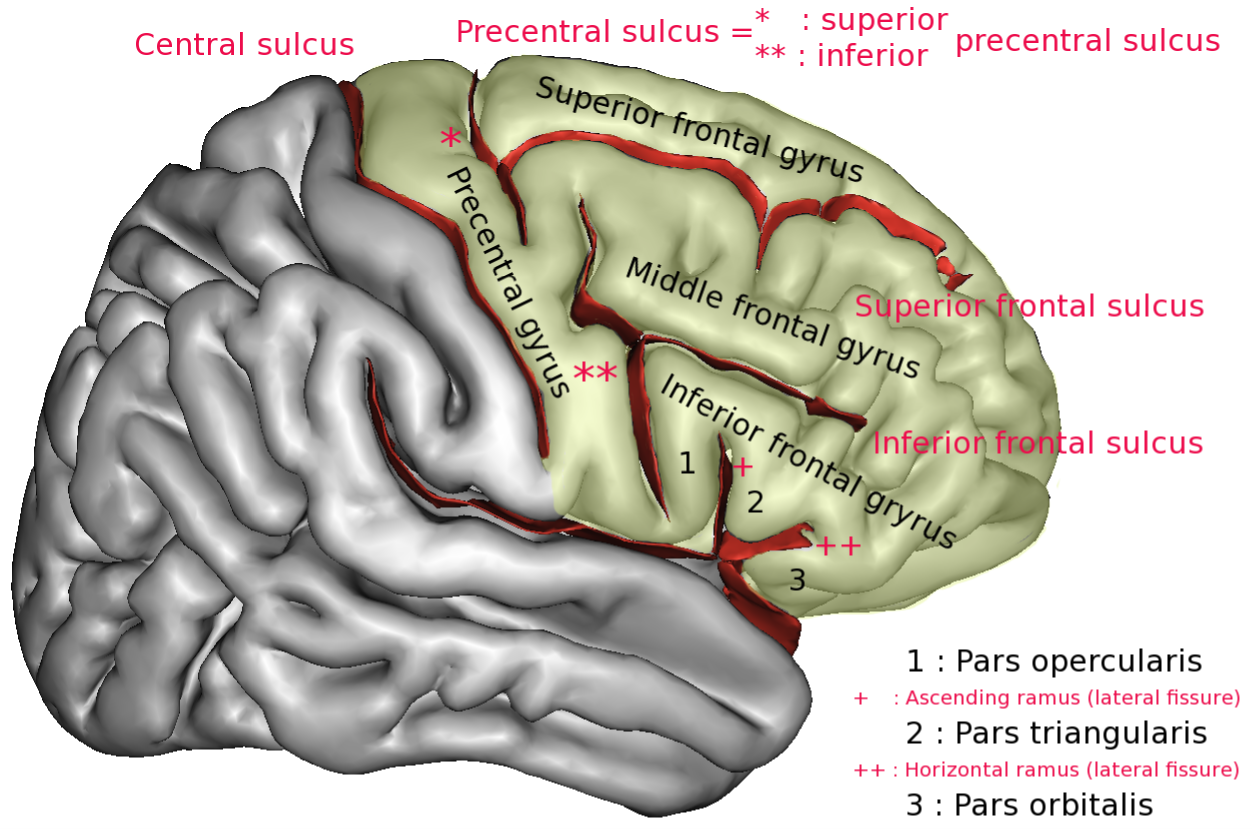
- Precentral gyrus a prominent gyrus of the frontal lobe

Details

Identifiers
- Latin: gyrus precentralis
- TA98: A14.1.09.119
- TA2: 5458
- FMA: 61894

The precentral gyrus is a prominent gyrus on the surface of the posterior frontal lobe of the brain. It is the site of the primary motor cortex that in humans is cytoarchitecturally defined as Brodmann area 4.

== Structure ==
The precentral gyrus lies in front of the postcentral gyrus – mostly on the lateral (convex) side of each cerebral hemisphere – from which it is separated by the central sulcus. Its anterior border is represented by the precentral sulcus, while inferiorly it borders to the lateral sulcus (Sylvian fissure). Medially, it is contiguous with the paracentral lobule.

The internal pyramidal layer (layer V) of the precentral cortex contains giant (70-100 micrometers) pyramidal neurons called Betz cells, which send long axons to the contralateral motor nuclei of the cranial nerves and to the lower motor neurons in the ventral horn of the spinal cord. These axons form the corticospinal tract. The Betz cells along with their long axons are referred to as upper motor neurons (UMN).

There is a precise somatotopic representation of the different body parts in the primary motor cortex, with the leg area located medially (close to the midline), and the head and face area located laterally on the convex side of the cerebral hemisphere (cortical homunculus). The arm and hand motor area is the largest and occupies the part of the precentral gyrus located in between the leg and face area.

== Function ==
The precentral gyrus is specialised for sending signals down to the spinal cord for movement. As they travel down through the cerebral white matter, the motor axons move closer together and form part of the posterior limb of the internal capsule. They continue down into the brainstem, where some of them, after crossing over to the contralateral side, distribute to the cranial nerve motor nuclei. (Note: a few motor fibers synapse with lower motor neurons on the same side of the brainstem). After crossing over to the contralateral side in the medulla oblongata (pyramidal decussation), the axons travel down the spinal cord as the lateral corticospinal tract. Fibers that do not cross over in the brainstem travel down the separate ventral corticospinal tract and most of them cross over to the contralateral side in the spinal cord, shortly before reaching the lower motor neurons.

== Blood supply ==
Branches of the middle cerebral artery provide most of the arterial blood supply for the primary motor cortex. The medial aspect (leg areas) is supplied by branches of the anterior cerebral artery.

== Clinical significance ==
Lesions of the precentral gyrus result in paralysis of the contralateral side of the body (facial palsy, arm or leg monoparesis, hemiparesis). New research has identified this as the part of the brain that makes sure our words are being properly articulated. This knowledge could help treat speech disorders and neural disorders in the future, the researchers say.

== Additional images ==

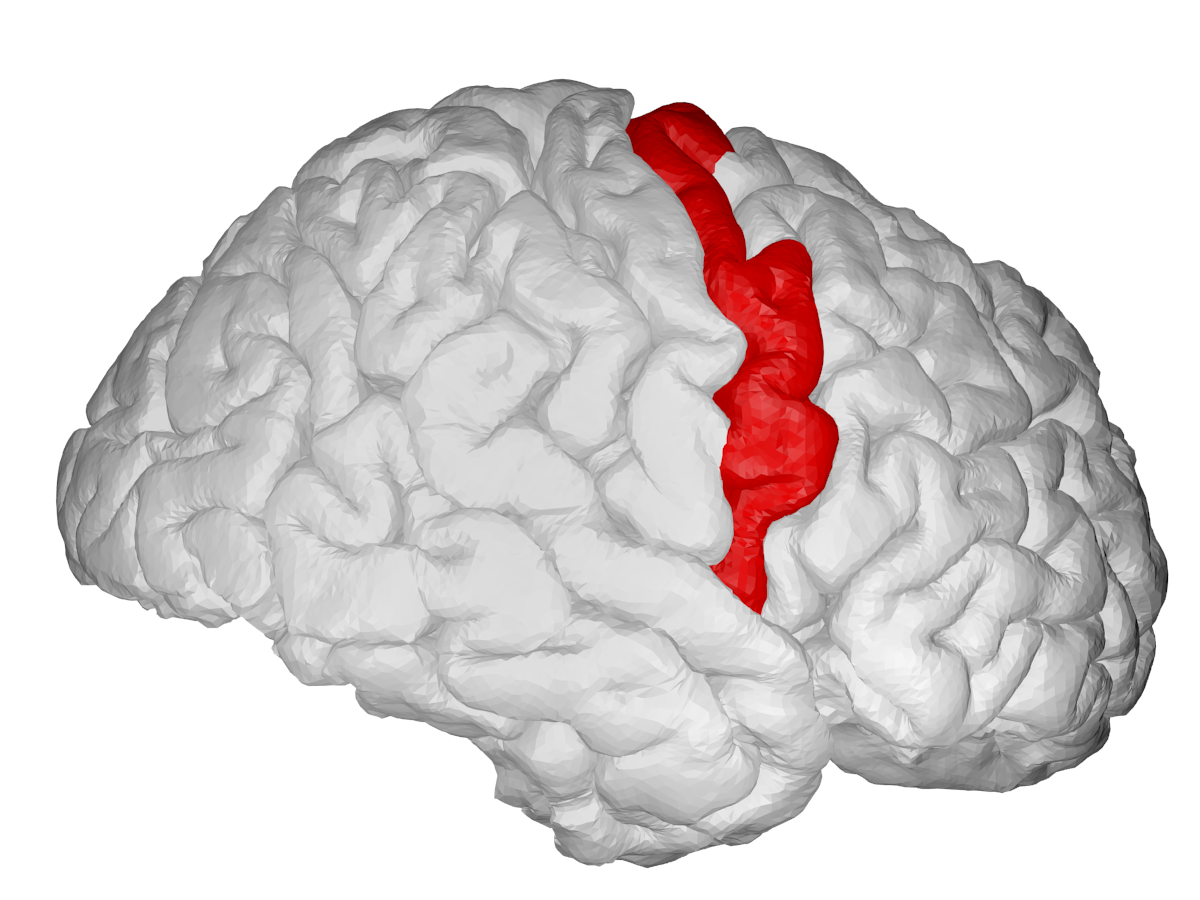

Precentral gyrus highlighted in green on coronal T1 MRI images

Precentral gyrus highlighted in green on sagittal T1 MRI images

Precentral gyrus highlighted in green on transversal T1 MRI images

== See also ==
- Corticospinal tract
- Motor cortex
- List of regions in the human brain
