= Primary motor cortex =

Part of the brain's frontal cortex

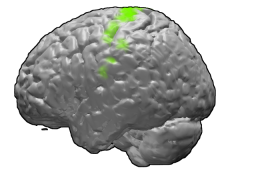
- Brodmann area 4 of the human brain.

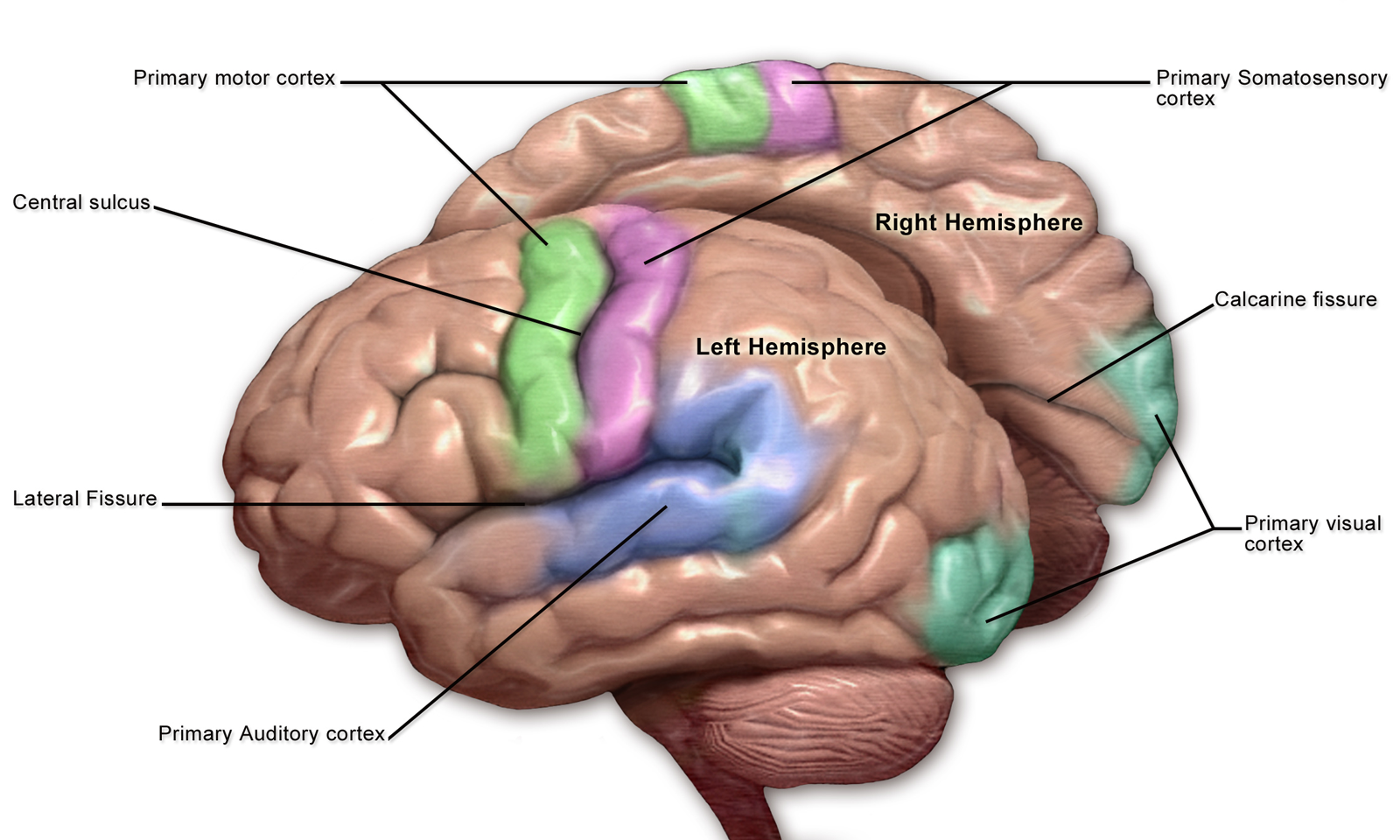
- Primary motor cortex shown in green.

Details
- Part of: Precentral gyrus
- Artery: Anterior cerebral Middle cerebral

Identifiers
- Latin: cortex motorius primus
- NeuroNames: 1910
- NeuroLex ID: nlx_143555
- FMA: 224854

Animation. Primary motor cortex (Brodmann area 4) of the left cerebral hemisphere shown in red.

The primary motor cortex (Brodmann area 4) is a brain region that in humans is located in the dorsal portion of the frontal lobe. It is the primary region of the motor system and works in association with other motor areas including premotor cortex, the supplementary motor area, posterior parietal cortex, and several subcortical brain regions, to plan and execute voluntary movements. Primary motor cortex is defined anatomically as the region of cortex that contains large neurons known as Betz cells, which, along with other cortical neurons, send long axons down the spinal cord to synapse onto the interneuron circuitry of the spinal cord and also directly onto the alpha motor neurons in the spinal cord which connect to the muscles.

At the primary motor cortex, motor representation is orderly arranged (in an inverted fashion) from the toe (at the top of the cerebral hemisphere) to mouth (at the bottom) along a fold in the cortex called the central sulcus. However, some body parts may be controlled by partially overlapping regions of cortex. Each cerebral hemisphere of the primary motor cortex only contains a motor representation of the opposite side of the body.

For the discovery of the primary motor cortex and its relationship to other motor cortical areas, see the main article on the motor cortex.

== Structure ==
The human primary motor cortex is located on the anterior wall of the central sulcus. It also extends anteriorly out of the sulcus partly onto the precentral gyrus. Anteriorly, the primary motor cortex is bordered by a set of areas that lie on the precentral gyrus and that are generally considered to compose the lateral premotor cortex. Posteriorly, the primary motor cortex is bordered by the primary somatosensory cortex, which lies on the posterior wall of the central sulcus. Ventrally the primary motor cortex is bordered by the insular cortex in the lateral sulcus. The primary motor cortex extends dorsally to the top of the hemisphere and then continues onto the medial wall of the hemisphere.

The location of the primary motor cortex is most obvious on histological examination due to the presence of the distinctive Betz cells. Layer V of the primary motor cortex contains giant (70-100 μm) pyramidal neurons which are the Betz cells. These neurons send long axons to the contralateral motor nuclei of the cranial nerves and to the lower motor neurons in the ventral horn of the spinal cord. These axons form a part of the corticospinal tract. The Betz cells account for only a small percentage of the corticospinal tract. By some measures, they account for about 10% of the primary motor cortex neurons projecting to the spinal cord or about 2-3% of the total cortical projection to the spinal cord. Though the Betz cells do not compose the entire motor output of the cortex, they nonetheless provide a clear marker for the primary motor cortex. This region of cortex, characterized by the presence of Betz cells, was termed area 4 by Brodmann.

=== Cellular components ===
The primary motor cortex alone has been shown to have as many as 116 different types of cells differentiated in their morphology, electrophysiological properties (including firing patterns) and gene expression profile (for example, by type of neurotransmitter released (GABA, glutamate etc.).

=== Pathway ===
As the primary motor axons travel down through the cerebral white matter, they move closer together and form part of the posterior limb of the internal capsule.

They continue down into the brainstem, where some of them, after crossing over to the contralateral side, distribute to the cranial nerve motor nuclei. (Note: a few motor fibers synapse with lower motor neurons on the same side of the brainstem).

After crossing over to the contralateral side in the medulla oblongata (pyramidal decussation), the axons travel down the spinal cord as the lateral corticospinal tract.

Fibers that do not cross over in the brainstem travel down the separate ventral corticospinal tract, and most of them cross over to the contralateral side in the spinal cord, shortly before reaching the lower motor neurons. In addition to the main corticospinal tract, Motor cortex projects to other cortical and subcortical areas, including the striatum, hypothalamus, midbrain and hindbrain, as well as the thalamus, basal ganglia, midbrain and medulla

=== Corticomotorneurons ===
Corticomotorneurons are neurons in the primary cortex which project directly to motor neurons in the ventral horn of the spinal cord. Axons of corticomotorneurons terminate on the spinal motor neurons of multiple muscles as well as on spinal interneurons. They are unique to primates and it has been suggested that their function is the adaptive control of the distal extremities (e.g. the hands) including the relatively independent control of individual fingers. Corticomotorneurons have so far only been found in the primary motor cortex and not in secondary motor areas.

=== Blood supply ===
Branches of the middle cerebral artery provide most of the arterial blood supply for the primary motor cortex.

The medial aspect (leg areas) is supplied by branches of the anterior cerebral artery.

== Function ==
=== Homunculus ===
There is a broad representation of the different body parts in the primary motor cortex in an arrangement called a motor homunculus (Latin: little person). The leg area is located close to the midline, in interior sections of the motor area folding into the medial longitudinal fissure. The lateral, convex side of the primary motor cortex is arranged from top to bottom in areas that correspond to the buttocks, torso, shoulder, elbow, wrist, fingers, thumb, eyelids, lips, and jaw. The arm and hand motor area is the largest, and occupies the part of precentral gyrus between the leg and face area.

These areas are not proportional to their size in the body with the lips, face parts, and hands represented by particularly large areas due to the comparative enrichment and density of motor receptor in these regions. Following amputation or paralysis, motor areas can shift to adopt new parts of the body.

=== Neural input from the thalamus ===
The primary motor cortex receives thalamic inputs from different thalamic nuclei. Among others:

- Ventral lateral nucleus for cerebellar afferents

- Ventral anterior nucleus for basal ganglia afferents

=== Alternative maps ===
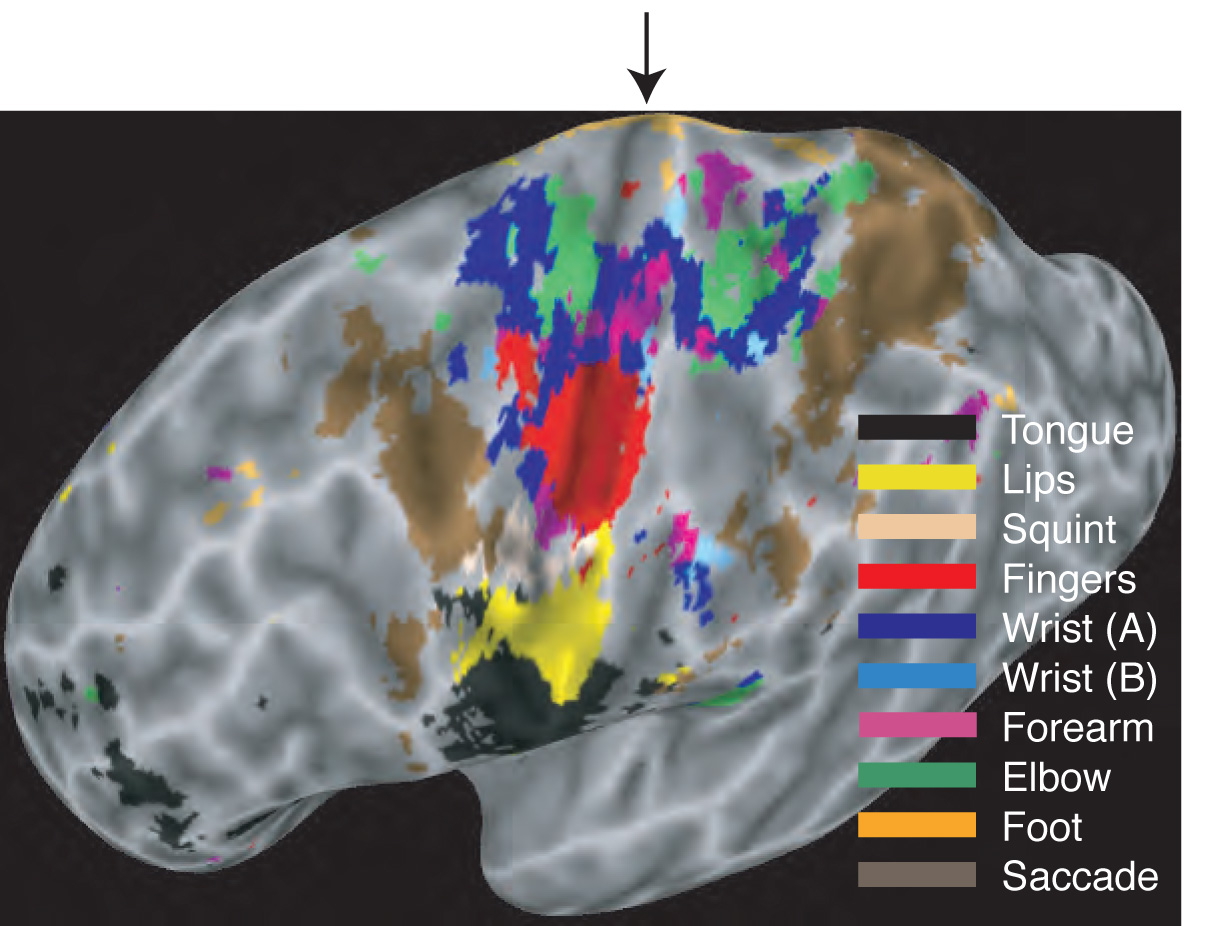
Map of the body in the human brain

At least two modifications to the classical somatotopic ordering of body parts have been reported in the primary motor cortex of primates.

First, the arm representation may be organized in a core and surround manner. In the monkey cortex, the digits of the hand are represented in a core area at the posterior edge of the primary motor cortex. This core area is surrounded on three sides (on the dorsal, anterior, and ventral sides) by a representation of the more proximal parts of the arm including the elbow and shoulder. In humans, the digit representation is surrounded dorsally, anteriorly, and ventrally, by a representation of the wrist.

A second modification of the classical somatotopic ordering of body parts is a double representation of the digits and wrist studied mainly in the human motor cortex. One representation lies in a posterior region called area 4p, and the other lies in an anterior region called area 4a. The posterior area can be activated by attention without any sensory feedback and has been suggested to be important for initiation of movements, while the anterior area is dependent on sensory feedback. It can also be activated by imaginary finger movements and listening to speech while making no actual movements. This anterior representation area has been suggested to be important in executing movements involving complex sensoriomotor interactions. It is possible that area 4a in humans corresponds to some parts of the caudal premotor cortex as described in the monkey cortex.

In 2009, it was reported, that there are two evolutionary distinct regions, an older one on the outer surface, and a new one found in the cleft. The older one connects to the spinal motorneurons through interneurons in the spinal cord. The newer one, found only in monkeys and apes, connects directly to the spinal motorneurons. The direct connections form after birth, are dominant over the indirect connections, and are more flexible in the circuits they can develop which allows the post-natal learning of complex fine motor skills. "The emergence of the 'new' M1 region during evolution of the primate lineage is therefore likely to have been important for the enhanced manual dexterity of the human hand."

=== Common misconceptions ===
Certain misconceptions about the primary motor cortex are common in secondary reviews, textbooks, and popular material. Three of the more common misconceptions are listed here.

==== Segregated map of the body ====
One of the most common misconceptions about the primary motor cortex is that the map of the body is cleanly segregated. Yet it is not a map of individuated muscles or even individuated body parts. The map contains considerable overlap. This overlap increases in more anterior regions of the primary motor cortex. One of the main goals in the history of work on the motor cortex was to determine just how much the different body parts are overlapped or segregated in the motor cortex. Researchers who addressed this issue found that the map of the hand, arm, and shoulder contained extensive overlap. Studies that map the precise functional connectivity from cortical neurons to muscles show that even a single neuron in the primary motor cortex can influence the activity of many muscles related to many joints. In experiments on cats and monkeys, as animals learn complex, coordinated movements, the map in the primary motor cortex becomes more overlapping, evidently learning to integrate the control of many muscles. In monkeys, when electrical stimulation is applied to the motor cortex on a behavioral timescale, it evokes complex, highly integrated movements such as reaching with the hand shaped to grasp, or bringing the hand to the mouth and opening the mouth. This type of evidence suggests that the primary motor cortex, while containing a rough map of the body, may participate in integrating muscles in meaningful ways rather than in segregating the control of individual muscle groups. It has been suggested that a deeper principle of organization may be a map of the statistical correlations in the behavioral repertoire, rather than a map of body parts. To the extent that the movement repertoire breaks down partly into the actions of separate body parts, the map contains a rough and overlapping body arrangement.

==== M1 and primary motor cortex ====
The term "M1" and the term "primary motor cortex" are often used interchangeably. However, they come from different historical traditions and refer to different divisions of cortex. Some scientists suggested that the motor cortex could be divided into a primary motor strip that was more posterior and a lateral premotor strip that was more anterior. Early researchers who originally proposed this view included Campbell, Vogt and Vogt, Foerster, and Fulton. Others suggested that the motor cortex could not be divided in that manner. Instead, in this second view, the so-called primary motor and lateral premotor strips together composed a single cortical area termed M1. A second motor area on the medial wall of the hemisphere was termed M2 or the supplementary motor area. Proponents of this view included Penfield and Woolsey. Today the distinction between the primary motor cortex and the lateral premotor cortex is generally accepted. However, the term M1 is sometimes mistakenly used to refer to the primary motor cortex. Strictly speaking M1 refers to the single map that, according to some previous researchers, encompassed both the primary motor and the lateral premotor cortex.

==== Betz cells as the final common pathway ====
The Betz cells, or giant pyramidal cells in the primary motor cortex, are sometimes mistaken to be the only or main output from the cortex to the spinal cord. This mistake is old, dating back at least to Campbell in 1905. Yet the Betz cells compose only about 2-3% of the neurons that project from the cortex to the spinal cord, and only about 10% of the neurons that project specifically from the primary motor cortex to the spinal cord. A range of cortical areas including the premotor cortex, the supplementary motor area, and even the primary somatosensory cortex, project to the spinal cord. Even when the Betz cells are damaged, the cortex can still communicate to subcortical motor structures and control movement. If the primary motor cortex with its Betz cells is damaged, a temporary paralysis results and other cortical areas can evidently take over some of the lost function.

== Clinical significance ==
Lesions of the precentral gyrus result in paralysis of the contralateral side of the body (facial palsy, arm-/leg monoparesis, hemiparesis) - see upper motor neuron.

== Movement coding ==
Evarts suggested that each neuron in the motor cortex contributes to the force in a muscle. As the neuron becomes active, it sends a signal to the spinal cord, the signal is relayed to a motorneuron, the motorneuron sends a signal to a muscle, and the muscle contracts. The more activity in the motor cortex neuron, the more muscle force.

Georgopoulos and colleagues suggested that muscle force alone was too simple a description. They trained monkeys to reach in various directions and monitored the activity of neurons in the motor cortex. They found that each neuron in the motor cortex was maximally active during a specific direction of reach, and responded less well to neighboring directions of reach. On this basis they suggested that neurons in motor cortex, by "voting" or pooling their influences into a "population code", could precisely specify a direction of reach.

The proposal that motor cortex neurons encode the direction of a reach became controversial. Scott and Kalaska showed that each motor cortex neuron was better correlated with the details of joint movement and muscle force than with the direction of the reach. Schwartz and colleagues showed that motor cortex neurons were well correlated with the speed of the hand. Strick and colleagues found that some neurons in motor cortex were active in association with muscle force and some with the spatial direction of movement. Todorov proposed that the many different correlations are the result of a muscle controller in which many movement parameters happen to be correlated with muscle force.

The code by which neurons in the primate motor cortex control the spinal cord, and thus movement, remains debated.

Some specific progress in understanding how motor cortex causes movement has also been made in the rodent model. The rodent motor cortex, like the monkey motor cortex, may contain subregions that emphasize different common types of actions. For example, one region appears to emphasize the rhythmic control of whisking. Neurons in this region project to a specific subcortical nucleus in which a pattern generator coordinates the cyclic rhythm of the whiskers. This nucleus then projects to the muscles that control the whiskers.

== Additional images ==
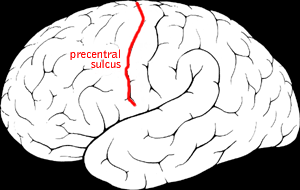
Precentral sulcus

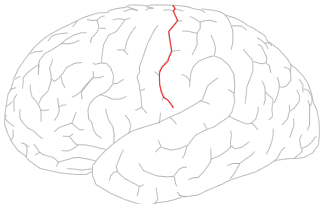
Central sulcus

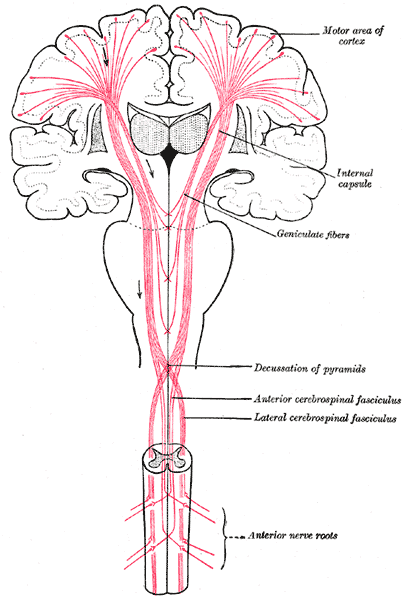
The motor tract.

== See also ==
- Corticospinal tract
- Motor cortex
- Cortical homunculus
- Upper motor neuron
- Brodmann area
- List of regions in the human brain
