= Betz cell =

Giant pyramidal neurons of the primary motor cortex

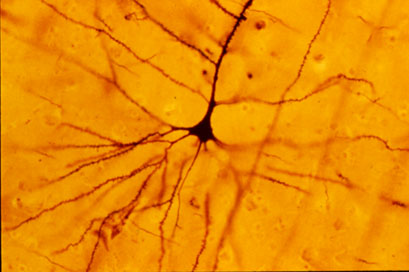
- A human neocortical pyramidal neuron such as a Betz Cell stained via Golgi technique.

Details
- Location: Layer V of cortex in primary motor cortex
- Shape: Multipolar pyramidal -- some of the longest axons in the body.
- Function: Excitatory projection neuron to spinal cord
- Neurotransmitter: Glutamate
- Presynaptic connections: Superficial cortical layers, premotor cortex
- Postsynaptic connections: Ventral horn of the spinal cord

Identifiers
- NeuroLex ID: sao786552500

Betz cells (also known as pyramidal cells of Betz) are giant pyramidal cells (neurons) located within the fifth layer of the grey matter in the primary motor cortex. These neurons are the largest in the central nervous system, sometimes reaching 100 μm in diameter.

Betz cells are upper motor neurons that send their axons down to the spinal cord via the corticospinal tract, where in humans they synapse directly with anterior horn cells, which in turn synapse directly with their target muscles. Betz cells are not the sole source of direct connections to those neurons because most of the direct corticomotorneuronal cells are medium or small neurons. While Betz cells have one apical dendrite typical of pyramidal neurons, they have more primary dendritic shafts, which can branch out at almost any point from the soma (cell body). These perisomatic (around the cell body) and basal dendrites project into all cortical layers, but most of their horizontal branches/arbors populate layers V and VI, some reaching down into the white matter. According to one study, Betz cells represent about 10% of the total pyramidal cell population in layer Vb of the human primary motor cortex.

Betz cells are named after Ukrainian scientist Vladimir Betz, who described them in his work published in 1874.

== See also ==
- List of distinct cell types in the adult human body
