= Cortical homunculus =

Distorted model of the body corresponding to sensory and motor nerve density

A 2-D model of cortical sensory homunculus

A cortical homunculus (from Latin homunculus 'little man, miniature human') is a distorted representation of the human body, based on a neurological "map" of the areas and portions of the human brain dedicated to processing motor functions, and/or sensory functions, for different parts of the body. Nerve fibres—conducting somatosensory information from all over the body—terminate in various areas of the parietal lobe in the cerebral cortex, forming a representational map of the body.

Findings from the 2010s and early 2020s began to call for a revision of the traditional "homunculus" model and a new interpretation of the internal body map (likely less simplistic and graphic), and research is ongoing in this field.

== Types ==
A 2-D cortical motor homunculus

=== Motor homunculus ===
A motor homunculus represents a map of brain areas dedicated to motor processing for different anatomical divisions of the body. The primary motor cortex is located in the precentral gyrus, and handles signals coming from the premotor area of the frontal lobes.

=== Sensory homunculus ===
A sensory homunculus represents a map of brain areas dedicated to sensory processing for different anatomical divisions of the body. The primary sensory cortex is located in the postcentral gyrus, and handles signals coming from the thalamus.

The thalamus itself receives corresponding signals from the brain stem and spinal cord.

== Arrangement ==
Along the length of the primary motor and sensory cortices, the areas specializing in different parts of the body are arranged in an orderly manner, although ordered differently than one might expect. The toes are represented at the top of the cerebral hemisphere (or more accurately, "the upper end," since the cortex curls inwards and down at the top), and then as one moves down the hemisphere, progressively higher parts of the body are represented, assuming a body that is faceless and has arms raised. Going further down the cortex, the different areas of the face are represented, in approximately top-to-bottom order, rather than bottom-to-top as before. The homunculus is split in half, with motor and sensory representations for the left side of the body on the right side of the brain, and vice versa.

The amount of cortex devoted to any given body region is not proportional to that body region's surface area or volume, but rather to how richly innervated that region is. Areas of the body with more complex and/or more numerous sensory or motor connections are represented as larger in the homunculus, while those with less complex and/or less numerous connections are represented as smaller. The resulting image is that of a distorted human body, with disproportionately huge hands, lips, and face.

In the sensory homunculus, below the areas handling sensation for the teeth, gums, jaw, tongue, and pharynx lies an area for intra-abdominal sensation. At the very top end of the primary sensory cortex, beyond the area for the toes, it has traditionally been believed that the sensory neural networks for the genitals occur. However, more recent research has suggested that there may be two different cortical areas for the genitals, possibly differentiated by one dealing with erogenous stimulation and the other dealing with non-erogenous stimulation.

== Discovery ==
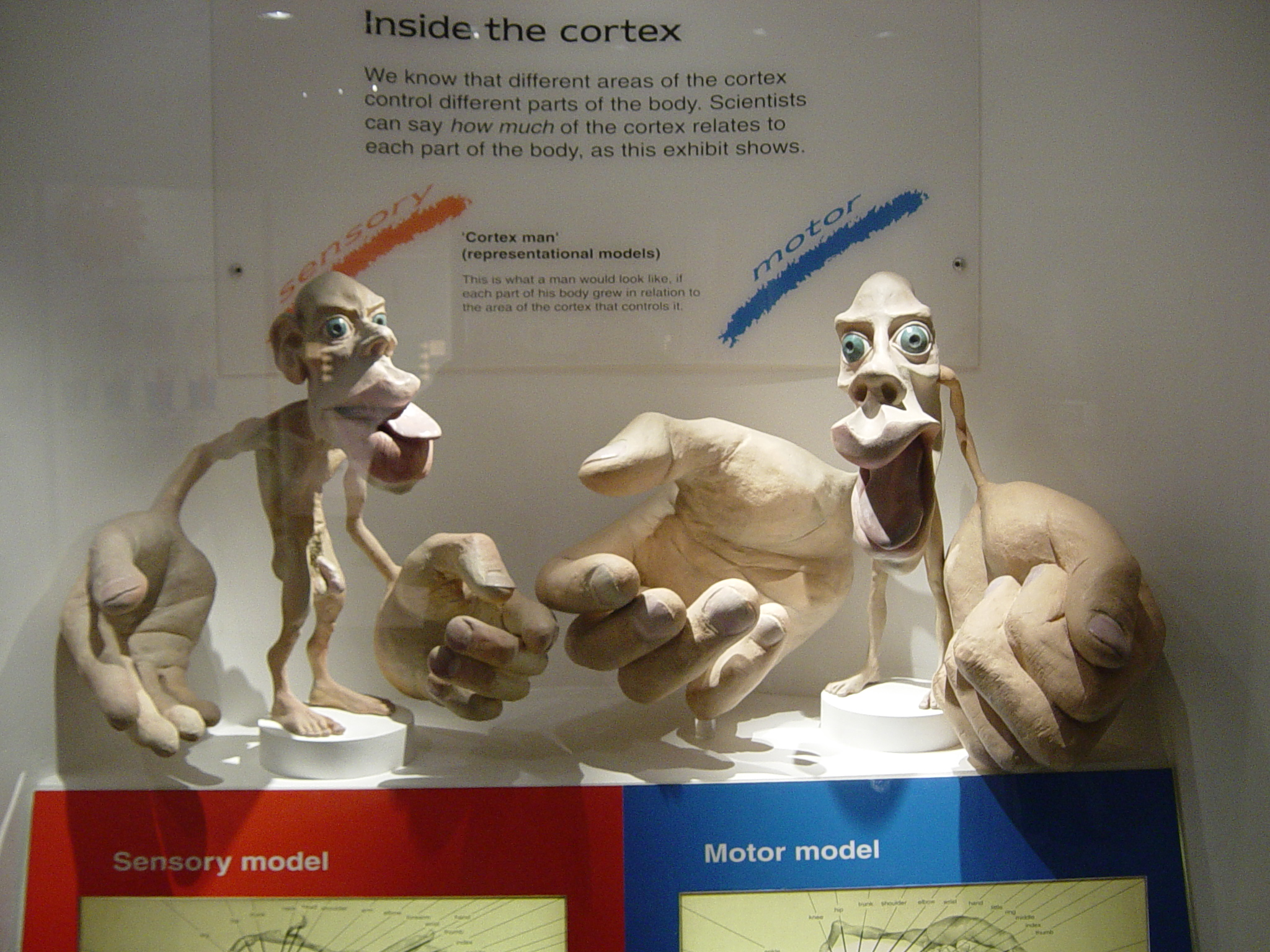
3-D sensory and motor homunculus models at the Natural History Museum, London

Wilder Penfield and his co-investigators Edwin Boldrey and Theodore Rasmussen are considered to be the originators of the sensory and motor homunculi. They were not the first scientists to attempt to objectify human brain function by means of a homunculus. However, they were the first to differentiate between sensory and motor function and to map the two across the brain separately, resulting in two different homunculi. In addition, their drawings and later drawings derived from theirs became perhaps the most famous conceptual maps in modern neuroscience because they compellingly illustrated the data at a single glance.

Penfield first conceived of his homunculi as a thought experiment, and went so far as to envision an imaginary world in which the homunculi lived, which he referred to as "if". He and his colleagues went on to experiment with electrical stimulation of different brain areas of patients undergoing open brain surgery to control epilepsy, and were thus able to produce the topographical brain maps and their corresponding homunculi.

More recent studies have improved this understanding of somatotopic arrangement using techniques such as functional magnetic resonance imaging (fMRI).

== Representation ==
Penfield referred to his creations as "grotesque creatures" due to their strange-looking proportions. For example, the sensory nerves arriving from the hands terminate over large areas of the brain, resulting in the hands of the homunculus being correspondingly large. In contrast, the nerves emanating from the torso or arms cover a much smaller area, thus the torso and arms of the homunculus look comparatively small and weak.

Penfield's homunculi are usually shown as 2-D diagrams. This is an oversimplification, as it cannot fully show the data set Penfield collected from his brain surgery patients. Rather than the sharp delineation between different body areas shown in the drawings, there is actually significant overlap between neighboring regions. The simplification suggests that lesions of the motor cortex will give rise to specific deficits in specific muscles. However, this is a misconception, as lesions produce deficits in groups of synergistic muscles. This finding suggests that the motor cortex functions in terms of overall movements as coordinated groups of individual motions.

The sensorimotor homunculi can also be represented as 3-D figures (such as the sensory homunculus sculpted by Sharon Price-James shown from different angles below), which can make it easier for laymen to understand the ratios between the levels of motor or sensory innervation of different body regions. However, these 3-D models do not illustrate which areas of the brain are associated with which parts of the body.

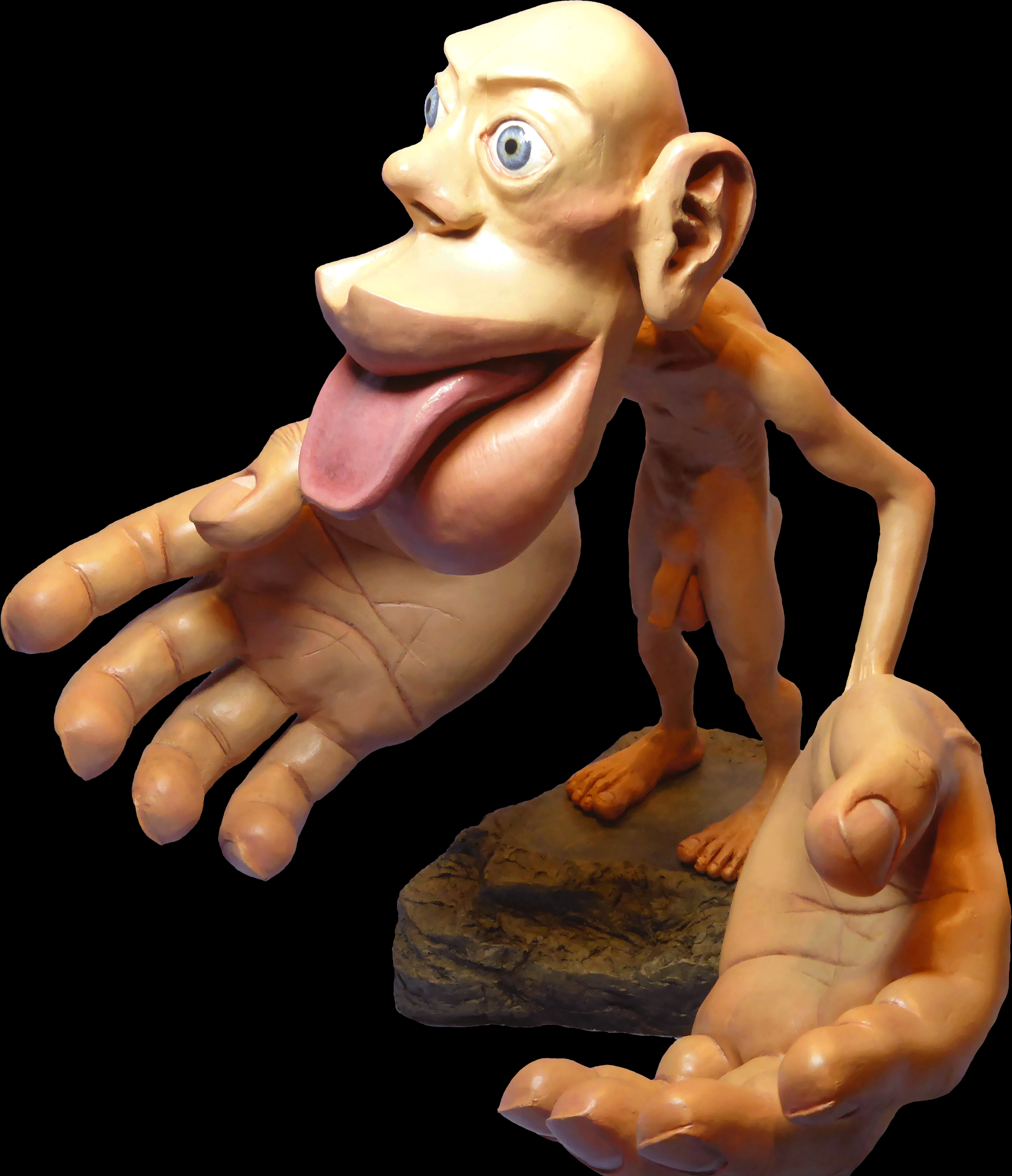

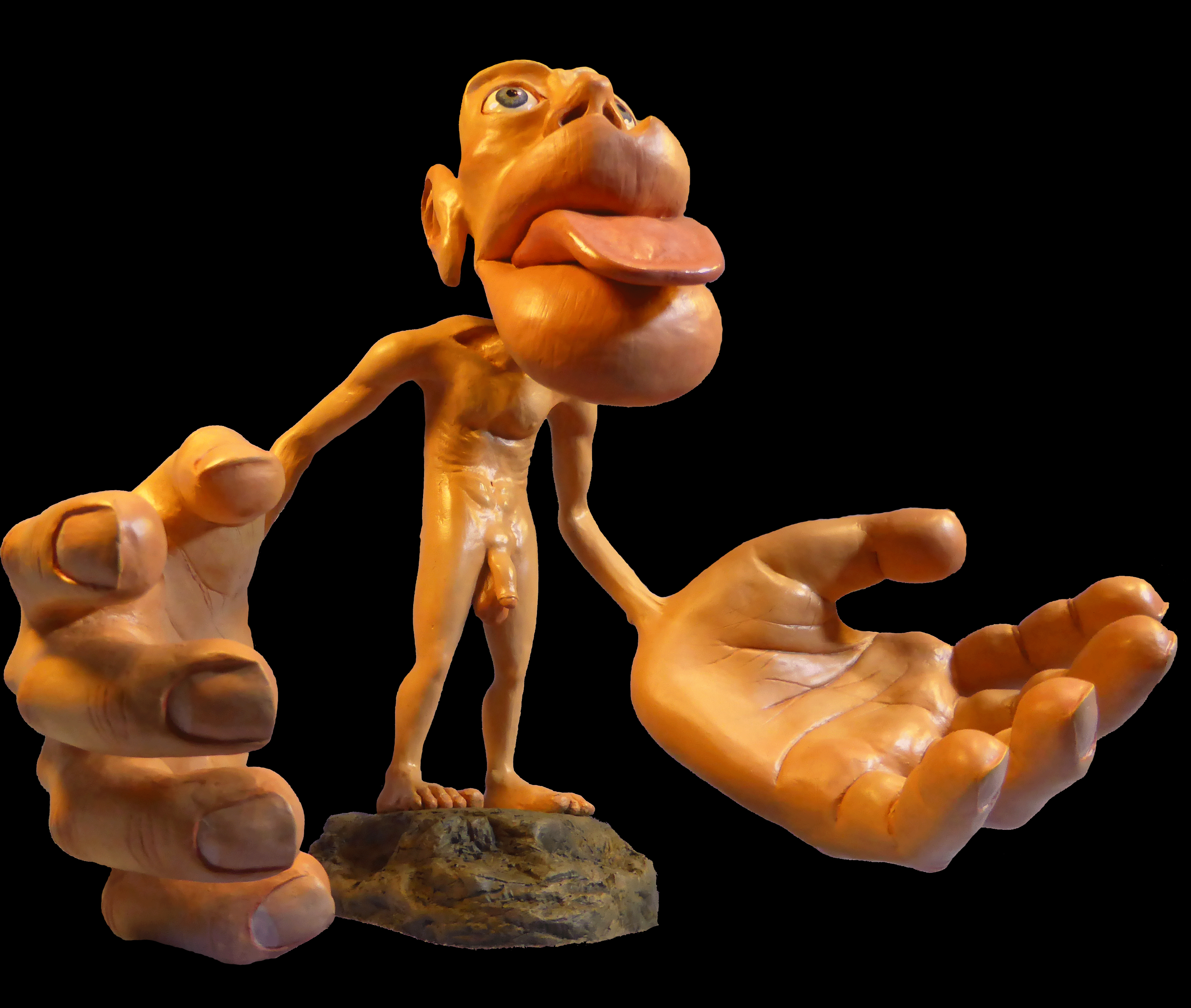

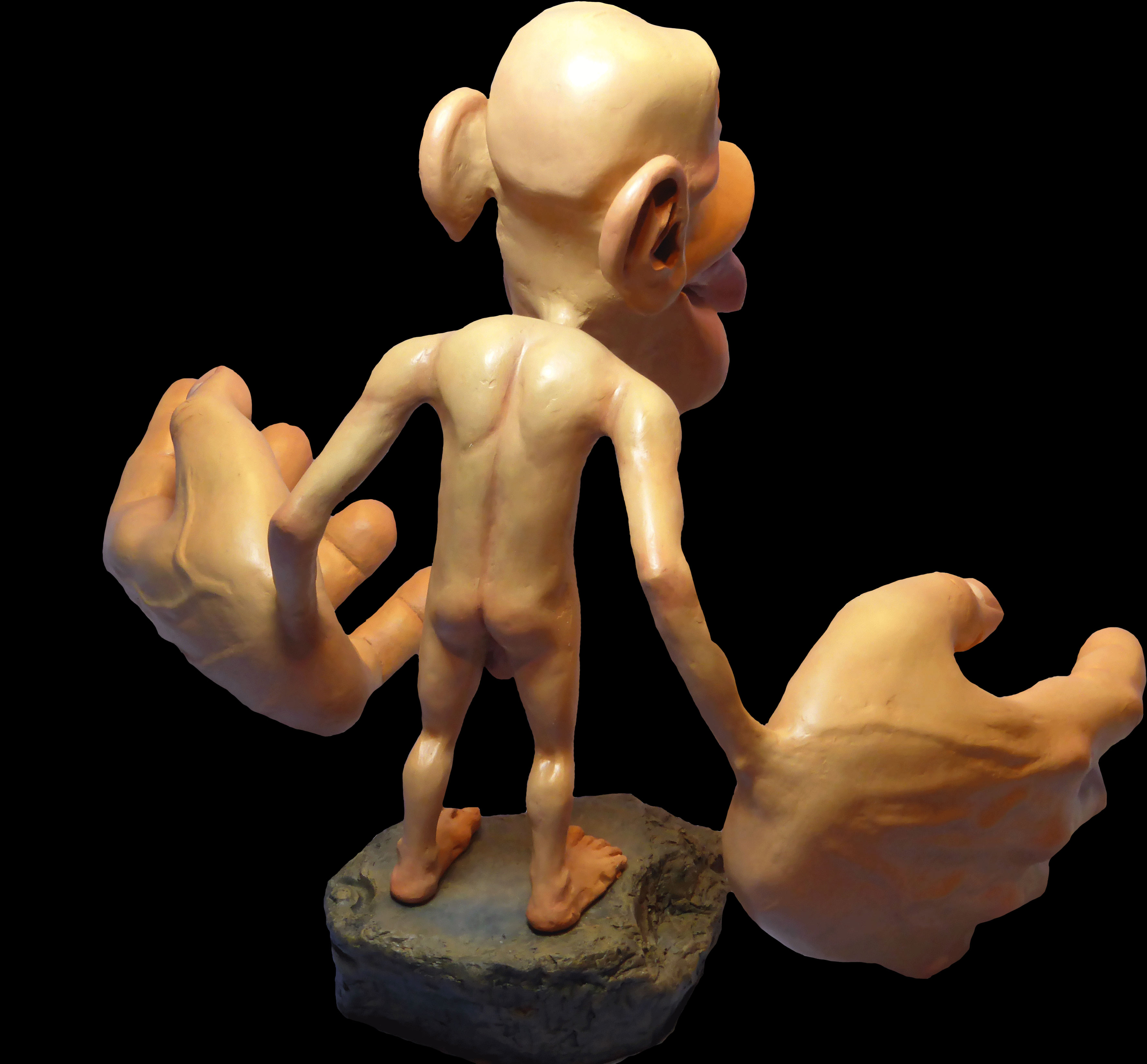

== See also ==
- Embodied cognition
- Somatotopic arrangement
- Topographic map (neuroanatomy)
