= Central sulcus =

Crevice in the brain separating the frontal and parietal lobes

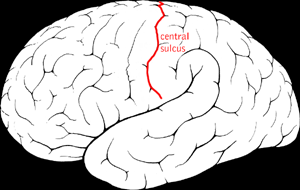
- The lateral surface of the left cerebral hemisphere. (Central sulcus shown in red)

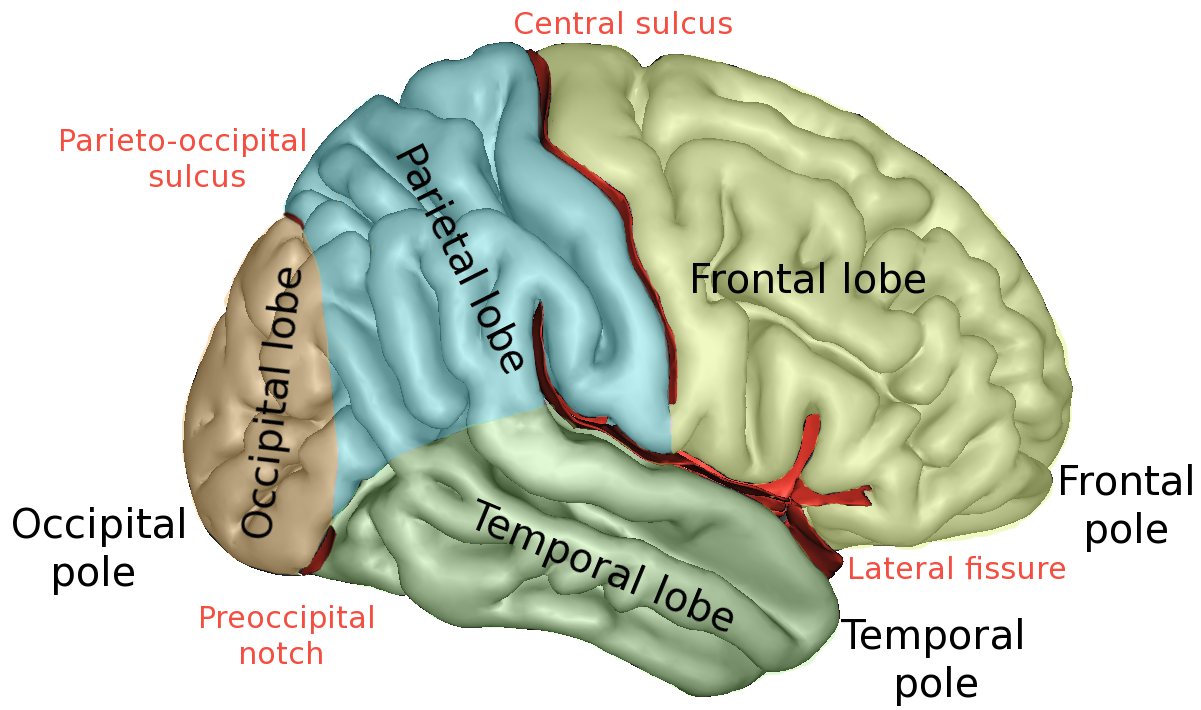
- The lateral surface of the right cerebral hemisphere. The central sulcus is labeled on the top center, in red. The central sulcus separates the parietal lobe (blue) and the frontal lobe (lime green).

Details
- Location: Cerebral cortex

Identifiers
- Latin: sulcus centralis cerebri
- NeuroNames: 48
- NeuroLex ID: birnlex_4035
- TA98: A14.1.09.103
- TA2: 5435
- FMA: 83752

In neuroanatomy, the central sulcus (also central fissure, fissure of Rolando, or Rolandic fissure, after Luigi Rolando) is a sulcus, or groove, in the cerebral cortex in the brains of vertebrates. It is sometimes confused with the longitudinal fissure.

The central sulcus is a prominent landmark of the brain, separating the parietal lobe from the frontal lobe and the primary motor cortex from the primary somatosensory cortex.

== Evolution of the central sulcus ==
The evolution of the central sulcus is theorized to have occurred in mammals when the complete dissociation of the original somatosensory cortex from its mirror duplicate developed in placental mammals such as primates, though the development did not stop there as time progressed the distinction between the two cortices grew.

=== Evolution in primates ===
The central sulcus is more prominent in apes as a result of fine-tuning of the motor system in apes. Hominins (bipedal apes) continued this trend through increased use of their hands due to the advent of bipedalism. This allowed for their hands to be freed up from their use in locomotion to focus on more complex manipulative actions such as grasping, tool use, tool making, and many others.

Previous studies have also shown that the location where the split in the central sulcus occurs is at the division point between the wrist and the individual digits in primary motor cortex, further implicating the relation between the development of this region through the use of their digits. The KNOB is also a suggested cortical substrate of the hand, as there have been anatomical asymmetries which have been linked to hand preference and skill, further suggesting the development of hands in the formation of the central sulcus seeing as the KNOB is the central portion of the central sulcus folded over the buried gyrus.

== Development in humans ==
The central sulcus begins developing around 13 weeks of gestational age and undergoes the fastest period of growth between 13 and 15 weeks of gestational age. However, the most active period of development is at approximately 18 to 19 weeks of gestational age. This is determined by when there is the greatest amount of migration of neurons and fibers occurring. It begins as a point or groove in the parasagittal region of the brain. It then becomes a distinct invagination that lengthens towards the lateral sulcus and towards the longitudinal fissure at approximately 22 to 23 weeks of gestational age.

Between 2 and 3 years of age, the landmark ‘Pli de Passage Frontoparietal Moyen’ (PPFM), which is a depression buried at the central part of the central sulcus, begins to appear. At 3 years of age, the average depth curve of the central sulcus is similar to that of adults.

=== Influences on development ===
The development of the shape of the central sulcus is influenced by both genetic and non-genetic factors. The deep structure of the central sulcus has been found to be more consistent in different brains than its superficial structure, suggesting that the superficial structure is more susceptible to non-genetic factors.

The shape of the central sulcus has been found to be different between people of different biological sex. Those of male biological sex have been found to have a less convoluted (small fractal dimension) right anterior wall of the central sulcus. In addition, while the width of the central sulcus varies, the central sulcus of males has shown to have a larger average width than the central sulcus of females. However, this is specific to the right hemisphere since the central sulcus of the left hemisphere has not shown significant results regarding gender differences. With regard to gender differences between hemispheres, females have been shown to have a larger average width of the central sulcus on the left side compared to that of the central sulcus on the right side.

Age also affects the shape of the central sulcus. In adults, the distance between the anterior and posterior walls (sulcal span) increases, while the surface area of walls, the sulcal length of the posterior wall, and the convolution (fractal dimension) for the right posterior wall of the central sulcus decrease. The posterior walls of the central sulcus appear to be affected more with age. Differences between genders regarding the average width of the central sulcus as one ages has also been shown. The average width of the central sulcus in males tends to increase more rapidly over time than that of females.

The surface area of the central sulcus has proven to have an effect on the handedness of an individual. Studies have found that when the central sulcus is larger in the left hemisphere, the individual tends to me more right hand dominant. This is also true about the central sulcus for left handed individuals; there is a greater surface area of the central sulcus in the right hemisphere. While the surface area of the central sulcus is shown to affect the handedness of an individual, it is not understood what the shape of the central sulcus affects as it is not widely explored. There is a region of the central sulcus, called the “hand knob”, which is a notch in the area of the hand motor region. The position of this “knob” can be indicative as well of someone's handedness.

As motor functions develop, it is expected that the shape of the central sulcus will change. This is due to the role of the central sulcus in separating the primary motor cortex and primary somatosensory cortex. For example, differences along the central sulcus have been reported in musicians, particularly with regard to an omega formation along the center portion of the central sulcus, commonly referred to as the "hand knob". Among musicians who specialize in string instruments, this omega formation is specific to the right central sulcus. However, among pianists, this omega formation occurs on both sides but more prominently on the left side.

== Clinical significance ==
=== Attention deficit hyperactivity disorder ===
Attention deficit hyperactivity disorder (ADHD) has been associated with sensorimotor deficits and the central sulcus divides both somatosensory and primary motor areas prompting research into how the shape of the central sulcus and ADHD may alter brain development in these individuals. The cortical thickness and average and maximum depth of the central sulcus has been shown to be larger for ADHD individuals when compared to normal individuals. Additionally, changes in the middle sections of the central sulcus have been linked to children with ADHD.

=== Williams syndrome ===
The morphology of the central sulcus has been suggested to play a role in individuals with the genetic condition known as Williams syndrome. The foreshortening of the central sulcus has been found to be an abnormality associated with this syndrome. This can be seen with the abnormal dorsal end of the central sulcus in individuals with Williams syndrome. However, the abnormal dorsal end of the central sulcus has not been found to be linked to impaired general intelligence. The functional importance of this abnormal part of the central sulcus is still not fully understood though.

=== Severe cerebral small vessel disease ===
The shape of the central sulcus has been linked to the degree of disability in individuals who have a small subcortical ischemic stroke as a result of severe cerebral small vessel disease. However, the severity of the disability has been found to not be fully dependent upon the morphology of the central sulcus. It was found to possibly be due to the hand knobs’ vertical position and size.

== Gallery ==
Position of central sulcus (shown in red).

Human brain dissection video. Demonstrating position of the central sulcus of the left cerebral hemisphere

== See also ==
- Primary motor cortex
- Primary somatosensory cortex
- Luigi Rolando
- List of human anatomical parts named after people
