= Frontal gyri =

Four gyri of the frontal lobe in the brain

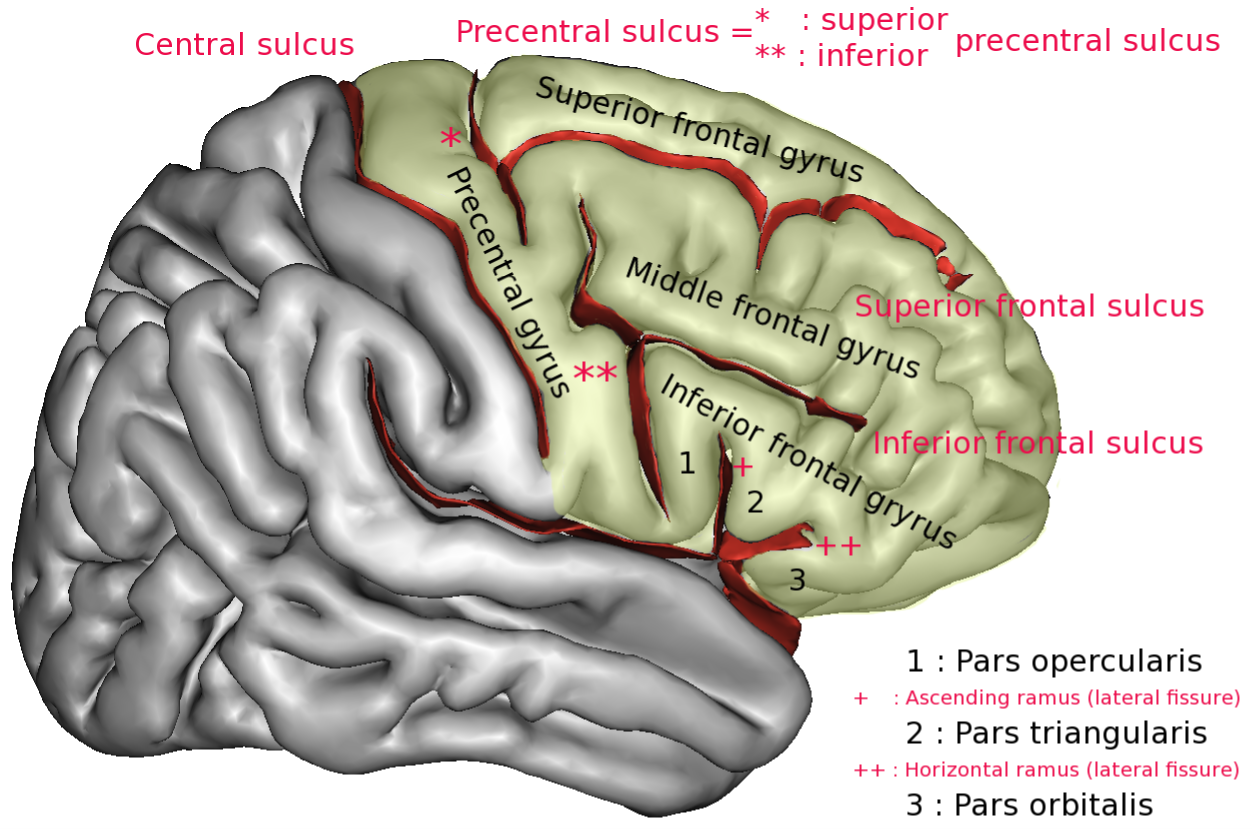

Details
- Part of: Frontal lobe
- Parts: Inferior, Medial, Middle and Superior

Identifiers
- Latin: gyri frontalis

The frontal gyri are six gyri of the frontal lobe in the brain. There are five horizontally oriented, parallel convolutions, of the frontal lobe that are aligned anterior to posterior. Three are visible on the lateral surface of the brain and two are on the inferior surface of the frontal lobe in a region called orbitofrontal cortex. The other main gyrus of the frontal lobe is the precentral gyrus which is vertically oriented, and runs parallel with the precentral sulcus.

The uppermost of the five gyri is the superior frontal gyrus, below this is the middle frontal gyrus, and below this is the inferior frontal gyrus. Continuing from the superior frontal gyrus on the lateral surface, into the uppermost part of the medial surface of the hemisphere is the medial frontal gyrus. The inferior frontal gyrus includes Broca's area. On the inferior or ventral surface of the frontal lobe including the orbitofrontal cortex is the orbital gyrus. This is also called the orbital gyri because it is separated into four sections or gyri: anterior, posterior, lateral, and medial. The most medial gyrus of the frontal lobes on the inferior surface of the lobe is the straight gyrus, also called the gyrus rectus. The lowest part of the inferior frontal gyrus rests on the orbital part of the frontal bone.

== Gyri ==
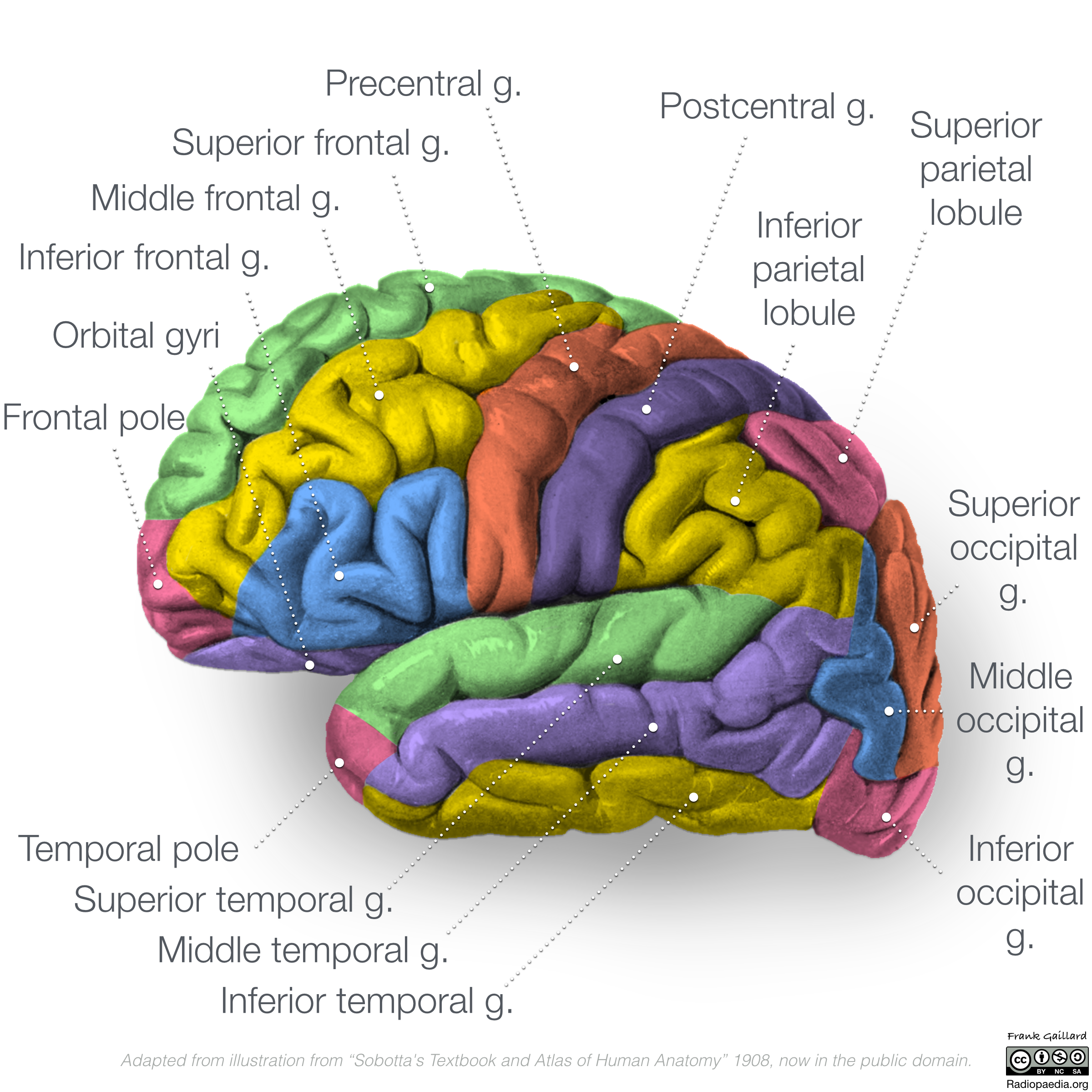
Diagram of gyri of brain viewed on lateral hemisphere. Frontal gyri labelled upper left.

=== Superior ===
The superior frontal gyrus makes up about a third of the frontal lobe. It is bounded laterally by the superior frontal sulcus.

=== Middle ===
It has been recently found that this region participates during linguistic tasks. More precisely, during interactive communication it is active during a phase of response planning.

=== Inferior ===
The inferior frontal gyrus includes Broca's area.
