= Connectogram =

Graphical representations of connectomics

Connectograms are graphical representations of connectomics, the field of study dedicated to mapping and interpreting all of the white matter fiber connections in the human brain. These circular graphs based on diffusion MRI data utilize graph theory to demonstrate the white matter connections and cortical characteristics for single structures, single subjects, or populations.

== Structure ==
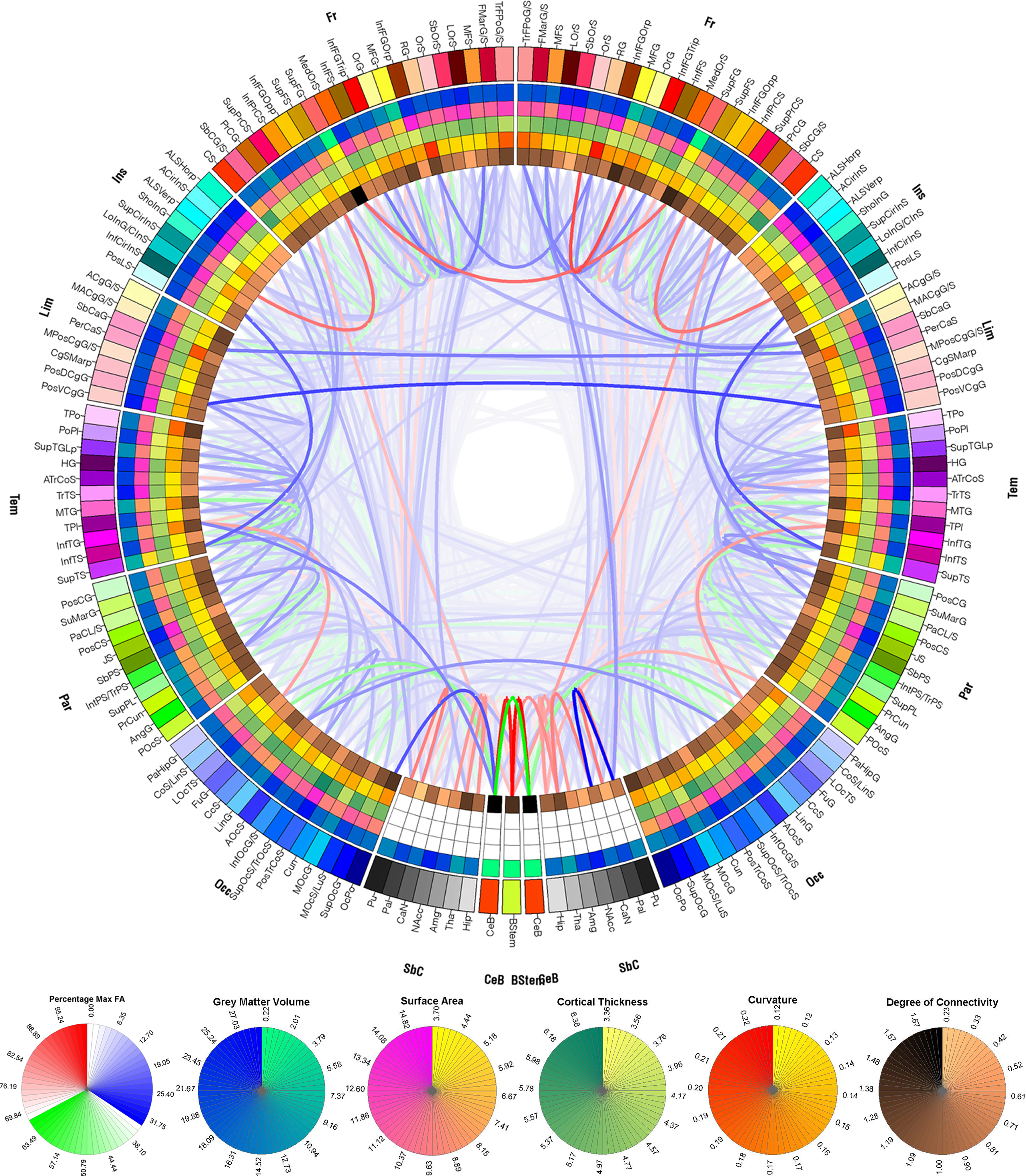
Connectogram showing average connections and cortical measures of 110 normal, right-handed males, aged 25-36.

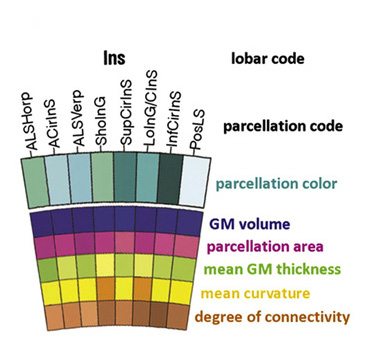
Legend for metadata presented in the various rings of the connectogram.

== Background and description ==
The connectogram, as a graphical representation of brain connectomics, was proposed in 2012.

Circular representations of connections have been used in a number of disciplines; examples include representation of aspects of epidemics, geographical networks, musical beats, diversity in bird populations, and genomic data. Connectograms were also cited as a source of inspiration for the heads-up display style of Tony Stark's helmet in Iron Man 3.

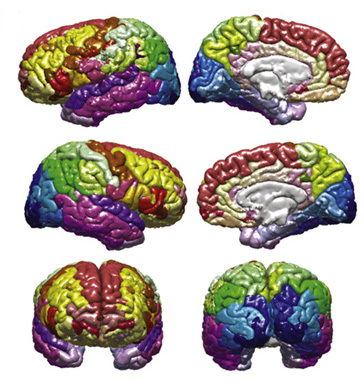
Brains colored according to the outer ring of the connectogram.

Connectograms are circular, with the left half depicting the left hemisphere and the right half depicting the right hemisphere. The hemispheres are further broken down into frontal lobe, insular cortex, limbic lobe, temporal lobe, parietal lobe, occipital lobe, subcortical structures, and cerebellum. At the bottom the brain stem is also represented between the two hemispheres. Within these lobes, each cortical area is labeled with an abbreviation and assigned its own color, which can be used to designate these same cortical regions in other figures, such as the parcellated brain surfaces in the adjacent image, so that the reader can find the corresponding cortical areas on a geometrically accurate surface and see exactly how disparate the connected regions may be. Inside the cortical surface ring, the concentric circles each represent different attributes of the corresponding cortical regions. In order from outermost to innermost, these metric rings represent the grey matter volume, surface area, cortical thickness, curvature, and degree of connectivity (the relative proportion of fibers initiating or terminating in the region compared to the whole brain). Inside these circles, lines connect regions that are found to be structurally connected. The relative density (number of fibers) of these connections is reflected in the opacity of the lines, so that one can easily compare various connections and their structural importance. The fractional anisotropy of each connection is reflected in its color.

== Uses ==
=== Brain mapping ===
With the recent concerted push to map all of the human brain and its connections, it has become increasingly important to find ways to graphically represent the large amounts of data involved in connectomics. Most other representations of the connectome use 3 dimensions, and therefore require an interactive graphical user interface. The connectogram can display 83 cortical regions within each hemisphere, and visually display which areas are structurally connected, all on a flat surface. It is therefore conveniently filed in patient records, or to display in print. The graphs were originally developed using the visualization tool called Circos.

This video cycles around the connectogram, showing only the connections that begin in one cortical region, before moving on to the next single region.

=== Clinical use ===
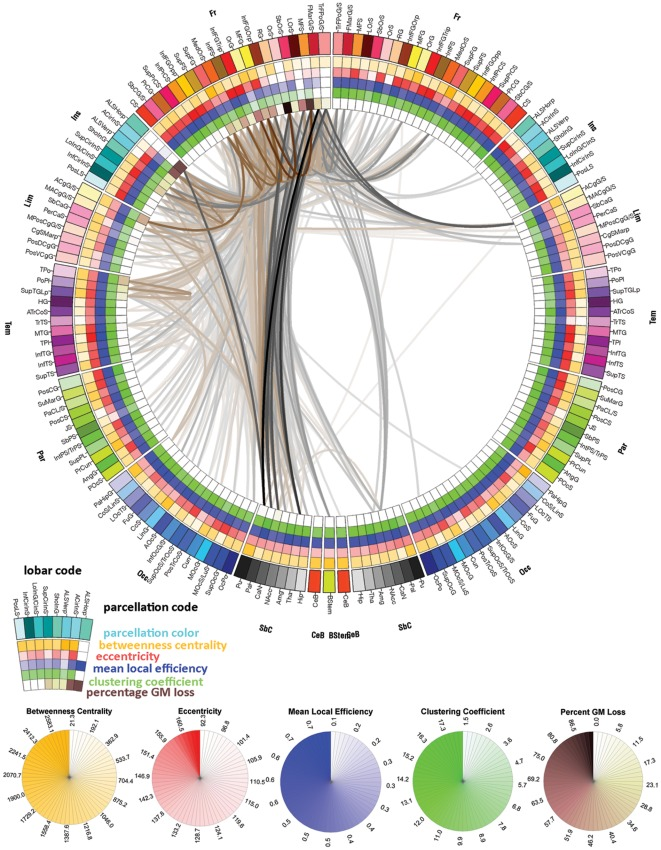
Connectogram, typical of those in clinical use, depicting estimated connection damage in Phineas Gage, who in 1848 survived a large iron bar being propelled through his skull and brain. The connectogram shows only the connections that were estimated to be damaged.

On an individual level, connectograms can be used to inform the treatment of patients with neuroanatomical abnormalities. Connectograms have been used to monitor the progression of neurological recovery of patients who suffered a traumatic brain injury (TBI). They have also been applied to famous patient Phineas Gage, to estimate damage to his neural network (as well as the damage at the cortical level—the primary focus of earlier studies on Gage).

=== Empirical study ===
Connectograms can represent the averages of cortical metrics (grey matter volume, surface area, cortical thickness, curvature, and degree of connectivity), as well as tractography data, such as the average densities and fractional anisotropy of the connections, across populations of any size. This allows for visual and statistical comparison between groups such as males and females, differing age cohorts, or healthy controls and patients. Some versions have been used to analyze how partitioned networks are in patient populations or the relative balance between inter- and intra-hemispheric connections.

=== Modified versions ===
There are many possibilities for which measures are included in the rings of a connectogram. Irimia and Van Horn (2012) have published connectograms which examine the correlative relationships between regions and uses the figures to compare the approaches of graph theory and connectomics. Some have been published without the inner circles of cortical metrics. Others include additional measures relating to neural networks, which can be added as additional rings to the inside to show metrics of graph theory, as in the extended connectogram here:

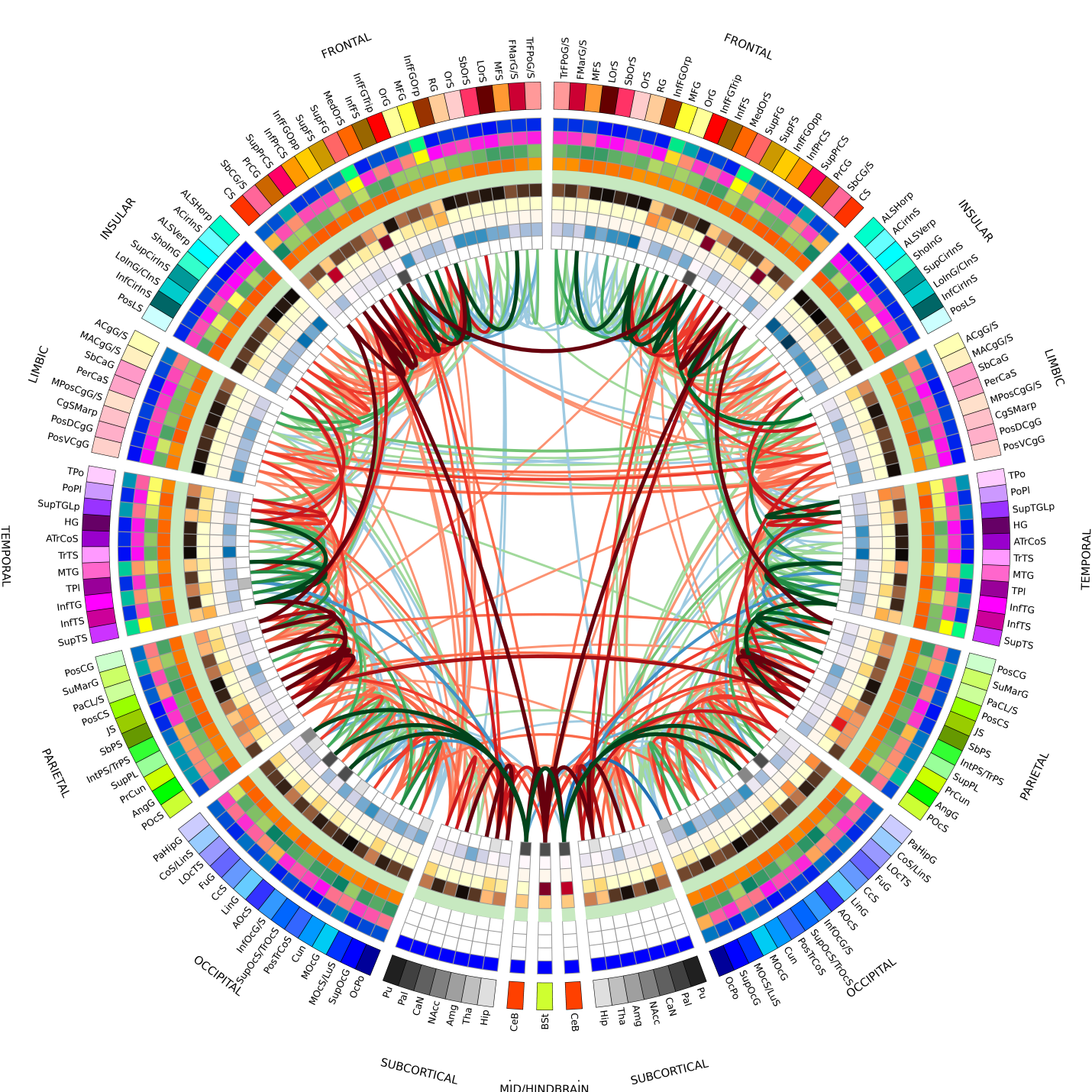
A connectogram of a healthy control subject, and includes 5 additional nodal measures not included in the standard connectogram. From outside to inside, the rings represent the cortical region, grey matter volume, surface area, cortical thickness, curvature, degree of connectivity, node strength, betweenness centrality, eccentricity, nodal efficiency, and eigenvector centrality. Between degree of connectivity and node strength, a blank ring has been added as a placeholder.

== Regions and their abbreviations ==
Acronym	Region in connectogram
ACgG/S	Anterior part of the cingulate gyrus and sulcus
ACirInS	Anterior segment of the circular sulcus of the insula
ALSHorp	Horizontal ramus of the anterior segment of the lateral sulcus (or fissure)
ALSVerp	Vertical ramus of the anterior segment of the lateral sulcus (or fissure)
AngG	Angular gyrus
AOcS	Anterior occipital sulcus and preoccipital notch (temporo-occipital incisure)
ATrCoS	Anterior transverse collateral sulcus
CcS	Calcarine sulcus
CgSMarp	Marginal branch (or part) of the cingulate sulcus
CoS/LinS	Medial occipito-temporal sulcus (collateral sulcus) and lingual sulcus
CS	Central sulcus (Rolando's fissure)
Cun	Cuneus
FMarG/S	Fronto-marginal gyrus (of Wernicke) and sulcus
FuG	Lateral occipito-temporal gyrus (fusiform gyrus)
HG	Heschl's gyrus (anterior transverse temporal gyrus)
InfCirInS	Inferior segment of the circular sulcus of the insula
InfFGOpp	Opercular part of the inferior frontal gyrus
InfFGOrp	Orbital part of the inferior frontal gyrus
InfFGTrip	Triangular part of the inferior frontal gyrus
InfFS	Inferior frontal sulcus
InfOcG/S	Inferior occipital gyrus and sulcus
InfPrCS	Inferior part of the precentral sulcus
IntPS/TrPS	Intraparietal sulcus (interparietal sulcus) and transverse parietal sulci
InfTG	Inferior temporal gyrus
InfTS	Inferior temporal sulcus
JS	Sulcus intermedius primus (of Jensen)
LinG	Lingual gyrus, lingual part of the medial occipito-temporal gyrus
LOcTS	Lateral occipito-temporal sulcus
LoInG/CInS	Long insular gyrus and central insular sulcus
LOrS	Lateral orbital sulcus
MACgG/S	Middle-anterior part of the cingulate gyrus and sulcus
MedOrS	Medial orbital sulcus (olfactory sulcus)
MFG	Middle frontal gyrus
MFS	Middle frontal sulcus
MOcG	Middle occipital gyrus, lateral occipital gyrus
MOcS/LuS	Middle occipital sulcus and lunatus sulcus
MPosCgG/S	Middle-posterior part of the cingulate gyrus and sulcus
MTG	Middle temporal gyrus
OcPo	Occipital pole
OrG	Orbital gyri
OrS	Orbital sulci (H-shaped sulci)
PaCL/S	Paracentral lobule and sulcus
PaHipG	Parahippocampal gyrus, parahippocampal part of the medial occipito-temporal gyrus
PerCaS	Pericallosal sulcus (S of corpus callosum)
POcS	Parieto-occipital sulcus (or fissure)
PoPl	Polar plane of the superior temporal gyrus
PosCG	Postcentral gyrus
PosCS	Postcentral sulcus
PosDCgG	Posterior-dorsal part of the cingulate gyrus
PosLS	Posterior ramus (or segment) of the lateral sulcus (or fissure)
PosTrCoS	Posterior transverse collateral sulcus
PosVCgG	Posterior-ventral part of the cingulate gyrus (isthmus of the cingulate gyrus)
PrCG	Precentral gyrus
PrCun	Precuneus
RG	Straight gyrus (gyrus rectus)
SbCaG	Subcallosal area, subcallosal gyrus
SbCG/S	Subcentral gyrus (central operculum) and sulci
SbOrS	Suborbital sulcus (sulcus rostrales, supraorbital sulcus)
SbPS	Subparietal sulcus
ShoInG	Short insular gyri
SuMarG	Supramarginal gyrus
SupCirInS	Superior segment of the circular sulcus of the insula
SupFG	Superior frontal gyrus
SupFS	Superior frontal sulcus
SupOcG	Superior occipital gyrus
SupPrCS	Superior part of the precentral sulcus
SupOcS/TrOcS	Superior occipital sulcus and transverse occipital sulcus
SupPL	Superior parietal lobule
SupTGLp	Lateral aspect of the superior temporal gyrus
SupTS	Superior temporal sulcus
TPl	Temporal plane of the superior temporal gyrus
TPo	Temporal pole
TrFPoG/S	Transverse frontopolar gyri and sulci
TrTS	Transverse temporal sulcus
Amg	Amygdala
CaN	Caudate nucleus
Hip	Hippocampus
NAcc	Nucleus accumbens
Pal	Pallidum
Pu	Putamen
Tha	Thalamus
CeB	Cerebellum
BStem	Brain stem

== See also ==
- Connectome – Comprehensive map of neural connections in the brain
- Connectomics – Study of mapping wiring diagrams
- Human Connectome Project – Research project
- Brain mapping – Set of neuroscience techniques
- Tractography – 3D visualization of nerve tracts via diffusion MRI
- Chord diagram (information visualization)
