= Frontal sulcus =

Frontal sulcus may refer to:

- Inferior frontal sulcus
- Superior frontal sulcus
