= Temporal sulcus =

Temporal sulcus may refer to:

- Inferior temporal sulcus
- Superior temporal sulcus
