= Superior sulcus =

The superior sulcus (groove) may refer to:

- Superior sulcus of the human brain
  - Superior frontal sulcus, a sulcus between the superior frontal gyrus and the middle frontal gyrus .
  - Superior temporal sulcus, the sulcus separating the superior temporal gyrus from the middle temporal gyrus in the temporal lobe
- A groove in the first rib. It may be compressed in Pancoast tumors (also called superior sulcus tumors). Not to be confused with the superior thoracic aperture.
