= Rhinal sulcus =

Groove in the brain's temporal lobe

- Basal view of diagram of human brain (rhinal sulcus not labeled, but is visible posterior to parahippocampal gyrus.)

Details

Identifiers
- Latin: sulcus rhinalis; fissura rhinalis; sulcus rhinicus; fissura rhinica
- NeuroNames: 41
- NeuroLex ID: birnlex_1368
- TA98: A14.1.09.240
- TA2: 5443
- FMA: 83746

In the human brain, the entorhinal cortex appears as a longitudinal elevation anterior to the parahippocampal gyrus, with a corresponding internal furrow, the external rhinal sulcus (or rhinal fissure). The rhinal sulcus separates the parahippocampal uncus from the rest of the temporal lobe in the neocortex. The rhinal sulcus and the hippocampal sulcus were both present in early mammals.

It is analogous to the collateral fissure found further caudally in the inferior part of the temporal lobe.
