= Medial frontal gyrus =

Part of the human brain

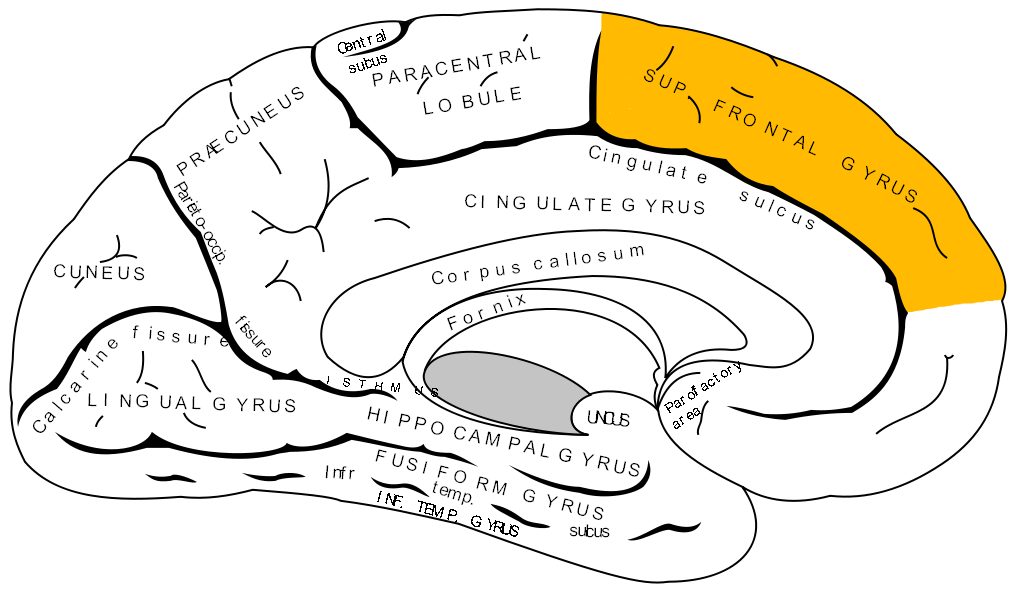
- Medial surface of left cerebral hemisphere.

Identifiers
- TA98: A14.1.09.207
- TA2: 5461

The medial frontal gyrus is a continuation of the superior frontal gyrus from its most anterior border onto the medial surface of the hemisphere. The medial and superior frontal gyri are two of the frontal gyri of the frontal lobe. The portion on the lateral surface of the hemisphere is usually more or less completely subdivided into an upper and a lower part by an antero-posterior sulcus, the paramedial sulcus, which, however, is frequently interrupted by bridging gyri.

There is some evidence that it plays a role in executive mechanisms.
