= Inferior frontal sulcus =

Groove in the brain's cerebral cortex

- Lateral surface of left cerebral hemisphere, viewed from the side.

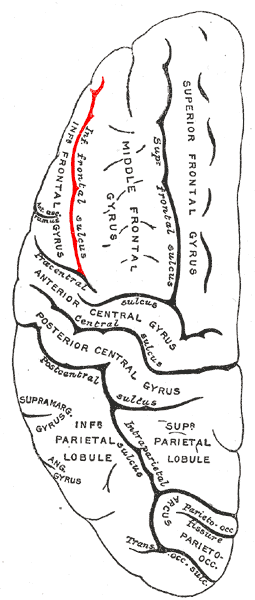
- Lateral surface of left cerebral hemisphere, viewed from above.

Details

Identifiers
- Latin: sulcus frontalis inferior
- NeuroNames: 63
- NeuroLex ID: birnlex_1619
- TA98: A14.1.09.117
- TA2: 5453
- FMA: 83757

The inferior frontal sulcus is a sulcus between the middle frontal gyrus and the inferior frontal gyrus.

== See also ==
- Superior frontal sulcus

== Additional images ==
Animation. Inferior frontal sulcus shown in red.

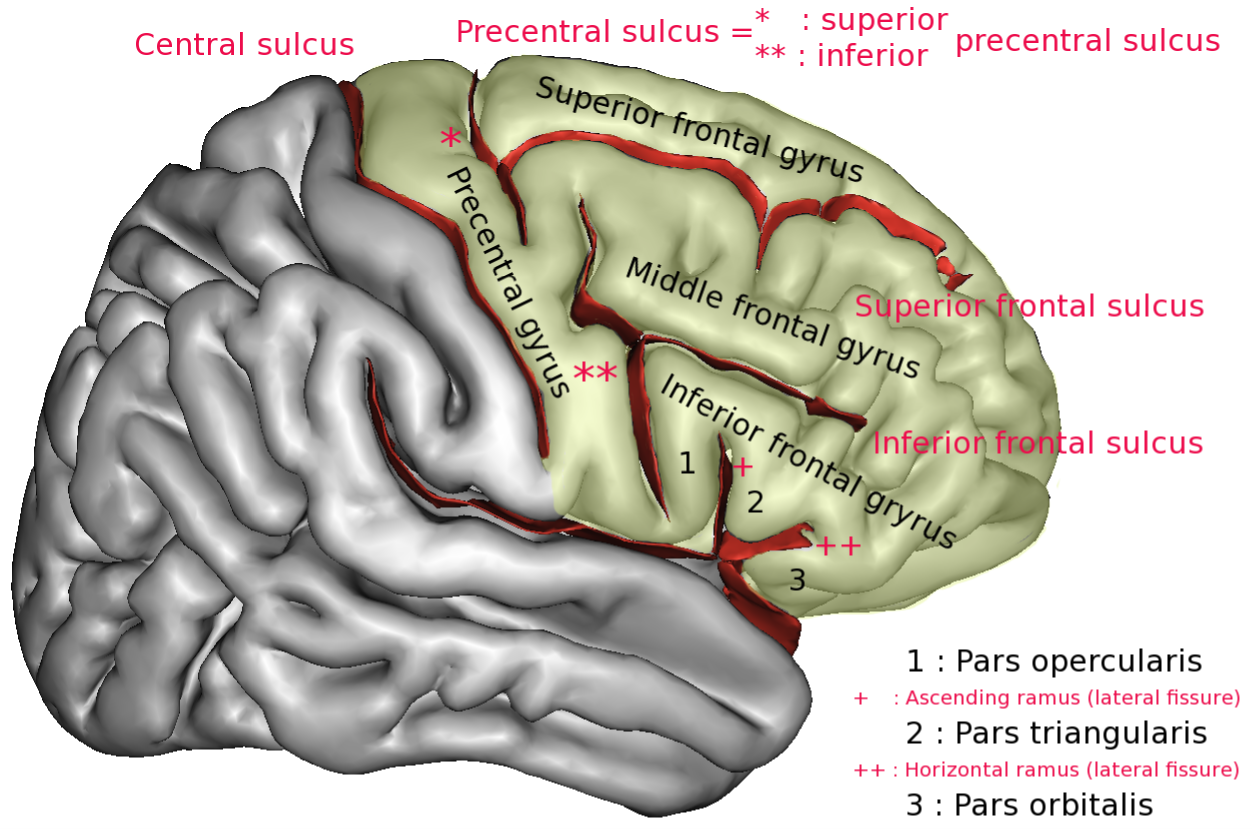
Outer surface of the right cerebral hemisphere.

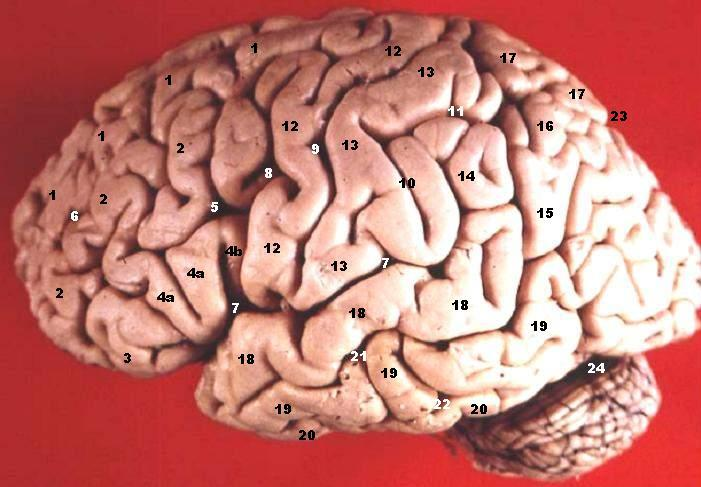
Human brain seen from side. Inferior frontal sulcus is labelled as #5 at mid-left.
