= Precentral sulcus =

Part of the human brain

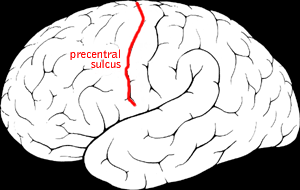
- Precentral sulcus of the human brain.

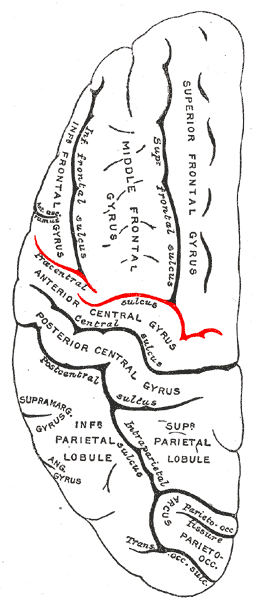
- Lateral surface of left cerebral hemisphere, viewed from above.

Details

Identifiers
- Latin: sulcus praecentralis
- TA98: A14.1.09.120
- TA2: 5457
- FMA: 83800

The precentral sulcus is a part of the human brain that lies parallel to, and in front of, the central sulcus. A sulcus is one of the prominent grooves on the surface of the human brain.

The precentral sulcus divides the inferior, middle and superior frontal gyri from the precentral gyrus. In most brains, the precentral sulcus is divided into two parts: the inferior precentral sulcus and the superior precentral sulcus. However, the precentral sulcus may sometimes be divided into three parts or form one continuous sulcus.

== Additional images ==
Position of precentral sulcus (shown in red).

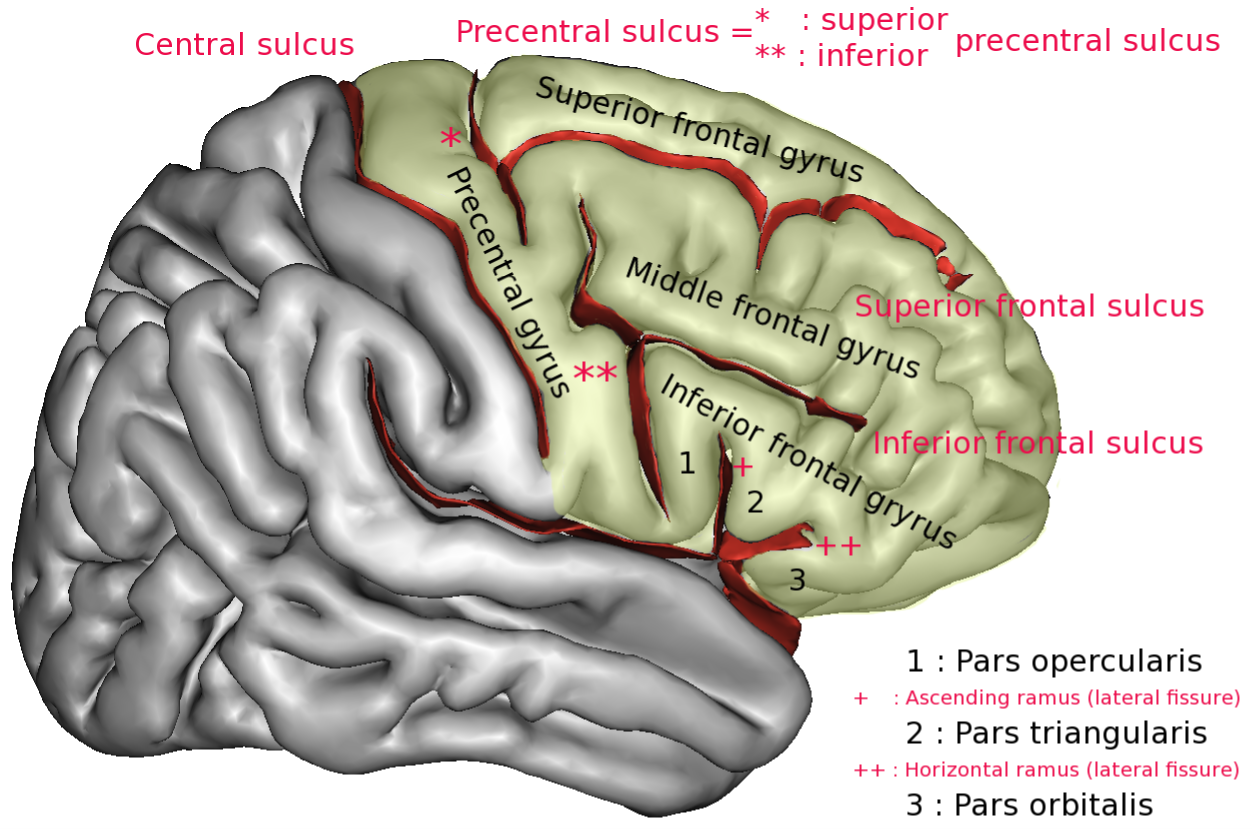
Lateral surface of right frontal lobe. Precentral sulcus is labeled by * and **.

Human brain dissection video (29 sec). Demonstrating location of the precentral sulcus.
