= Collateral fissure =

Brain structure

- Medial surface of left cerebral hemisphere. (Collateral fissure labeled at bottom left.)

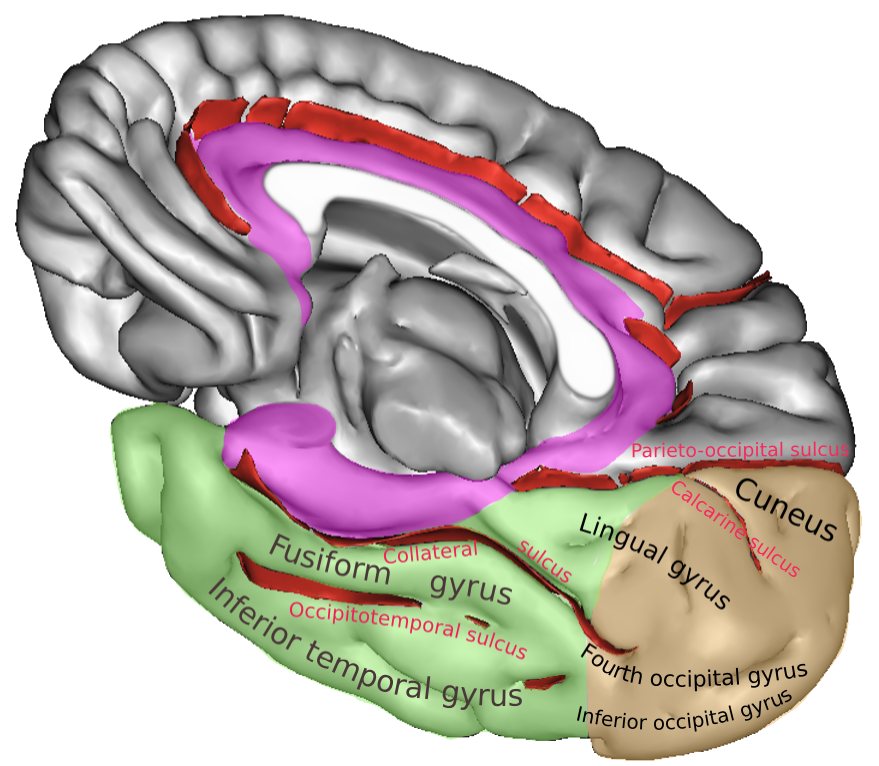
- Medial surface of right cerebral hemisphere. Collateral sulcus divides limbic (purple) and temporal lobe (green).

Details

Identifiers
- Latin: sulcus collateralis, fissura collateralis
- NeuroNames: 47
- TA98: A14.1.09.206
- TA2: 5442
- FMA: 83751

The collateral fissure is a large sulcus on the tentorial surface of the cerebral hemisphere and extends from near the occipital pole to within a short distance of the temporal pole. It is also known as the medial occipitotemporal sulcus.

Behind, it lies below and lateral to the calcarine fissure, from which it is separated by the lingual gyrus; in front, it is situated between the parahippocampal gyrus and the anterior part of the fusiform gyrus.

== Additional images ==
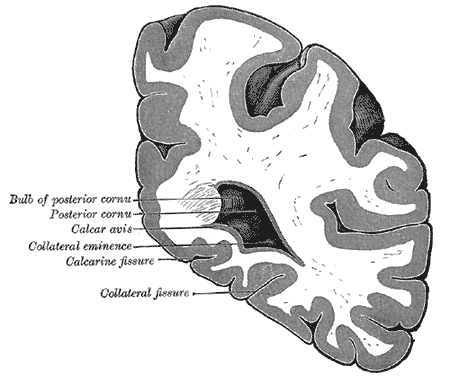
Coronal section through posterior cornua of lateral ventricle. (Collateral fissure labeled at bottom center.)

Human brain dissection video (62 sec). Demonstrating location of collateral sulcus.
