= Orbital sulcus =

Anatomical feature of the human brain

Orbital sulci
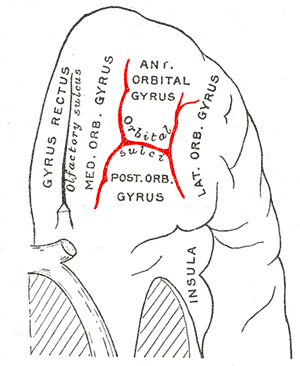
- Orbital surface of left frontal lobe.

Details

Identifiers
- Latin: sulci orbitales
- NeuroNames: 79
- TA98: A14.1.09.217
- TA2: 5465
- FMA: 83770

The inferior or orbital surface of the frontal lobe is concave, and rests on the orbital plate of the frontal bone. It is divided into four orbital gyri by a well-marked H-shaped sulcus the orbital sulcus.

== Additional images ==
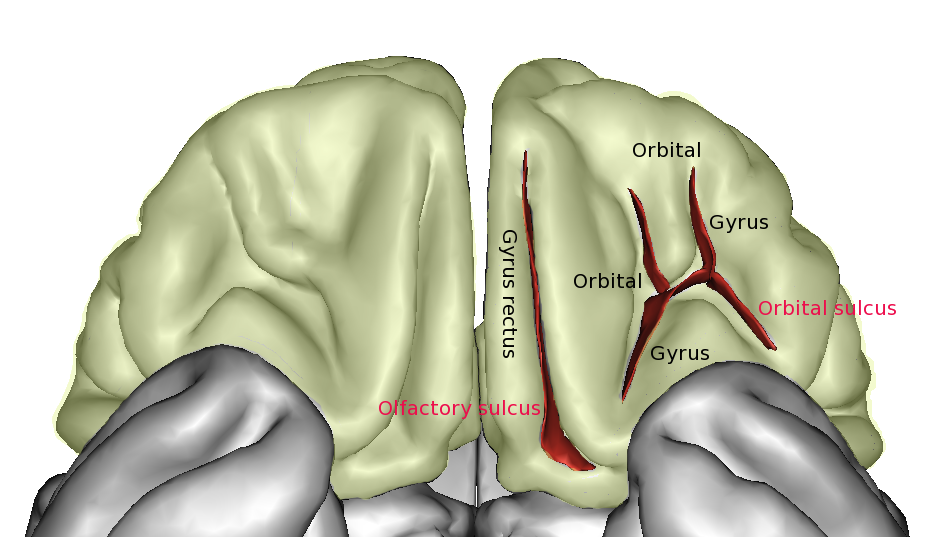
Cerebrum. Inferior view.

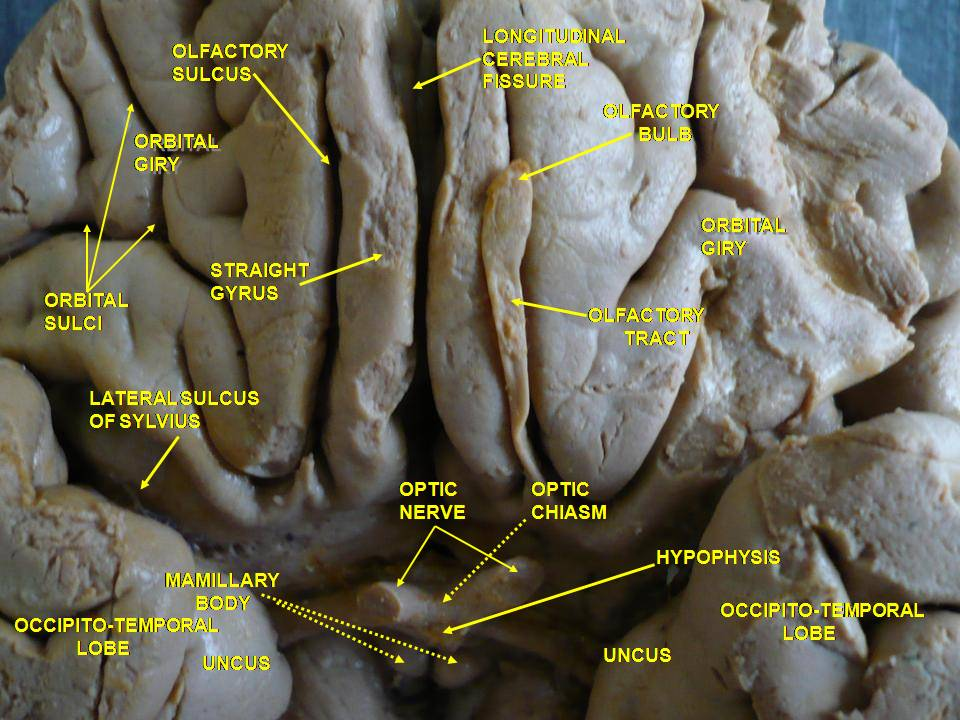
Cerebrum. Inferior view. Deep dissection.
