= Middle frontal gyrus =

Part of the brain's frontal lobe

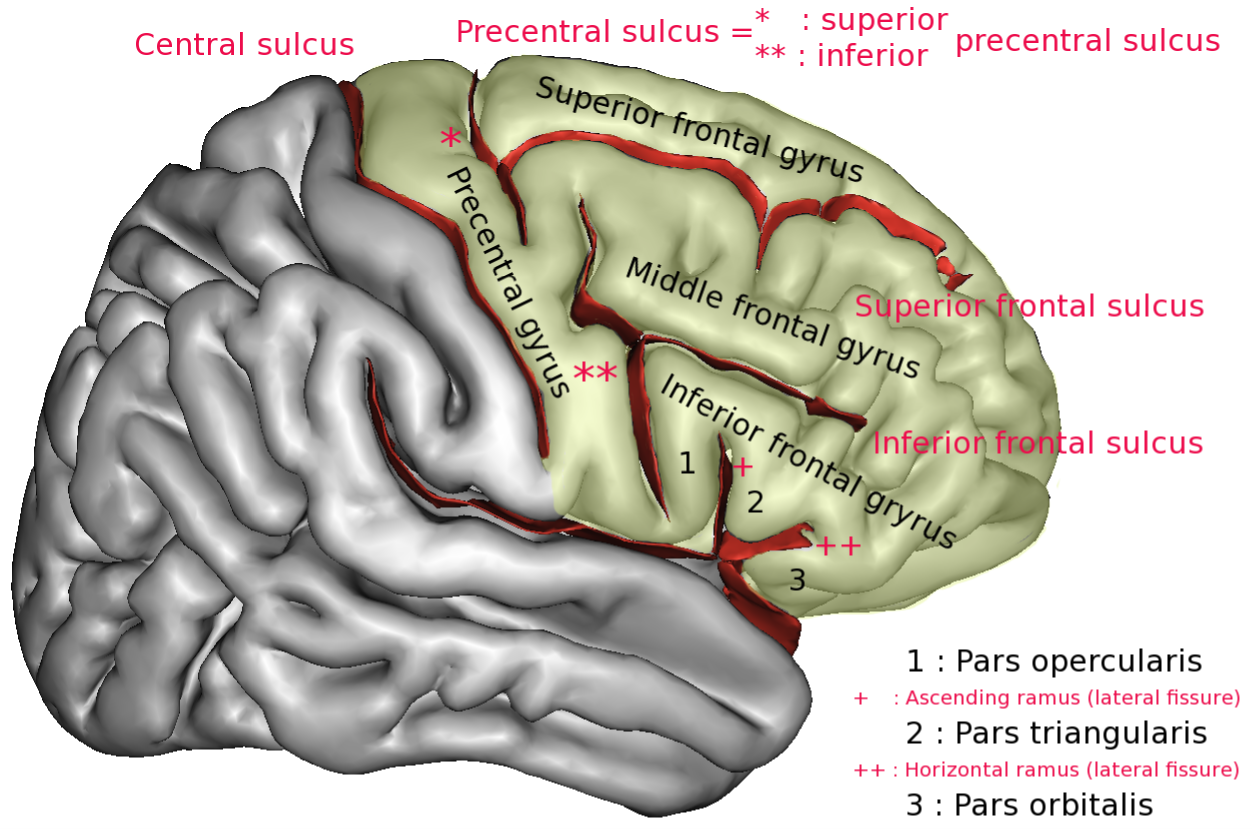
- Middle frontal gyrus of the human brain.

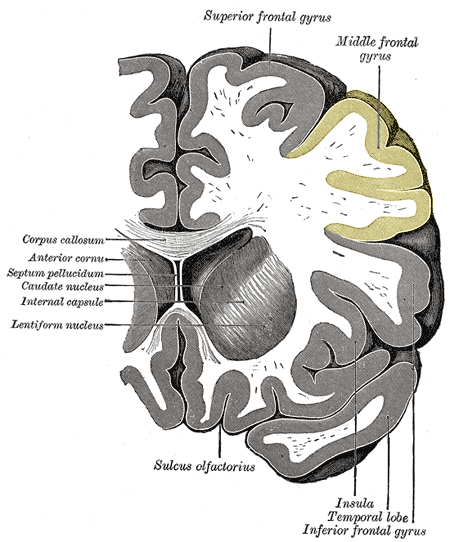
- Coronal section through anterior cornua of lateral ventricles.

Details
- Part of: Frontal lobe
- Artery: Middle cerebral

Identifiers
- Latin: gyrus frontalis medius
- NeuroNames: 84
- NeuroLex ID: birnlex_1451
- TA98: A14.1.09.118
- TA2: 5454
- FMA: 61859

The middle frontal gyrus makes up about one-third of the frontal lobe of the human brain. (A gyrus is one of the prominent "bumps" or "ridges" on the cerebral cortex.

The middle frontal gyrus, like the inferior frontal gyrus and the superior frontal gyrus, is more of a region in the frontal gyrus than a true gyrus.

The borders of the middle frontal gyrus are the inferior frontal sulcus below; the superior frontal sulcus above; and the precentral sulcus behind.

== Additional images ==
Position of middle frontal gyrus (shown in red).

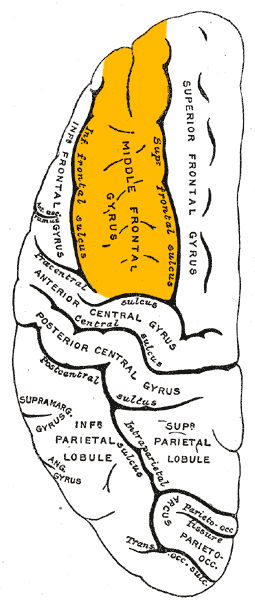
Left cerebral hemisphere seen from above.

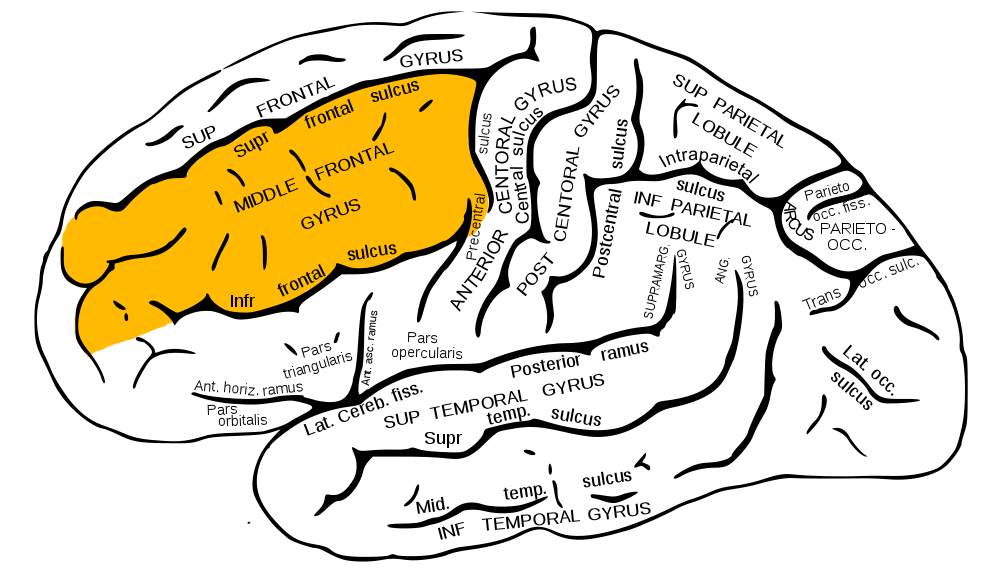
Lateral surface of left cerebral hemisphere.

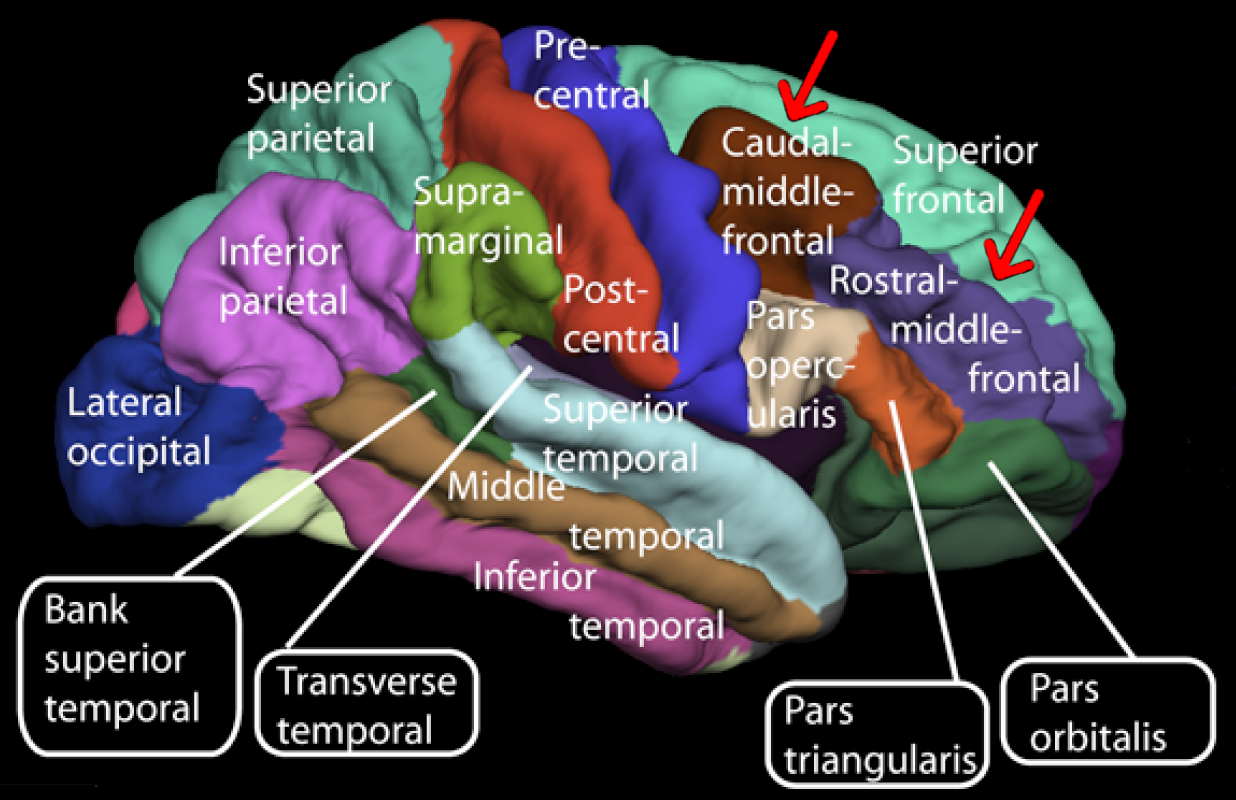
Lateral surface of right cerebral hemisphere. Middle frontal gyrus is noted by red arrows.

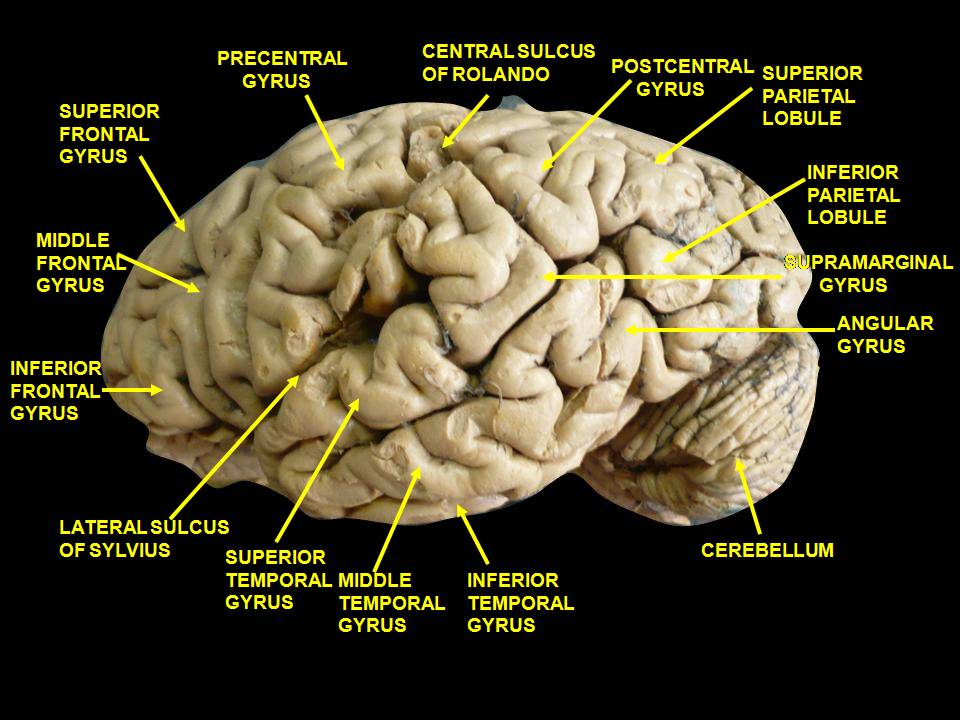
Cerebrum. Lateral view.Deep dissection.

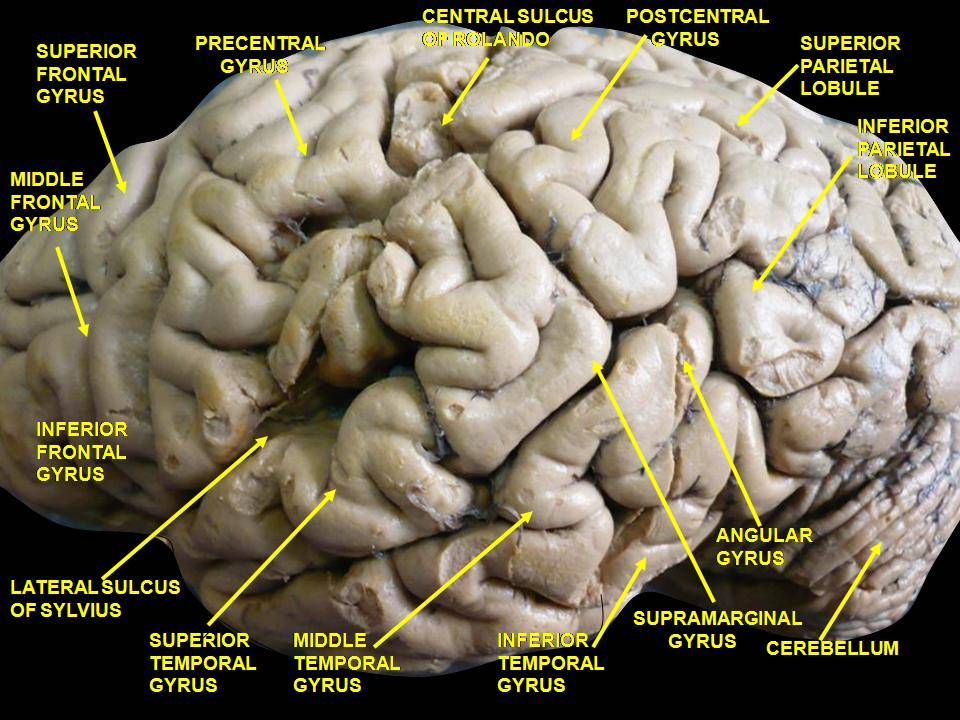
Cerebrum. Lateral view.Deep dissection.

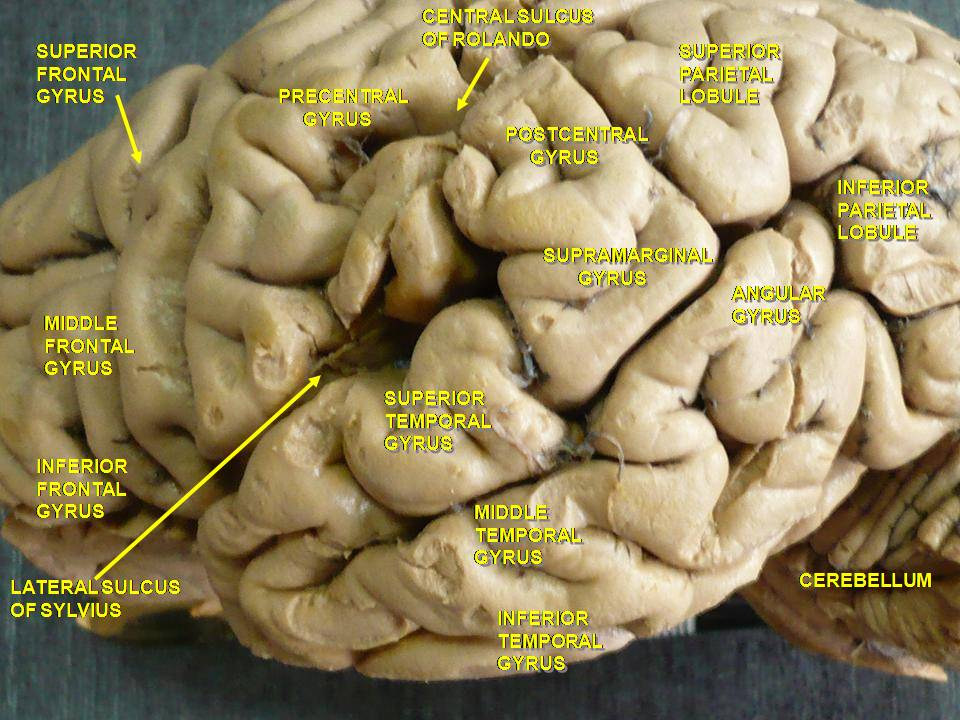
Cerebrum. Lateral view.Deep dissection.

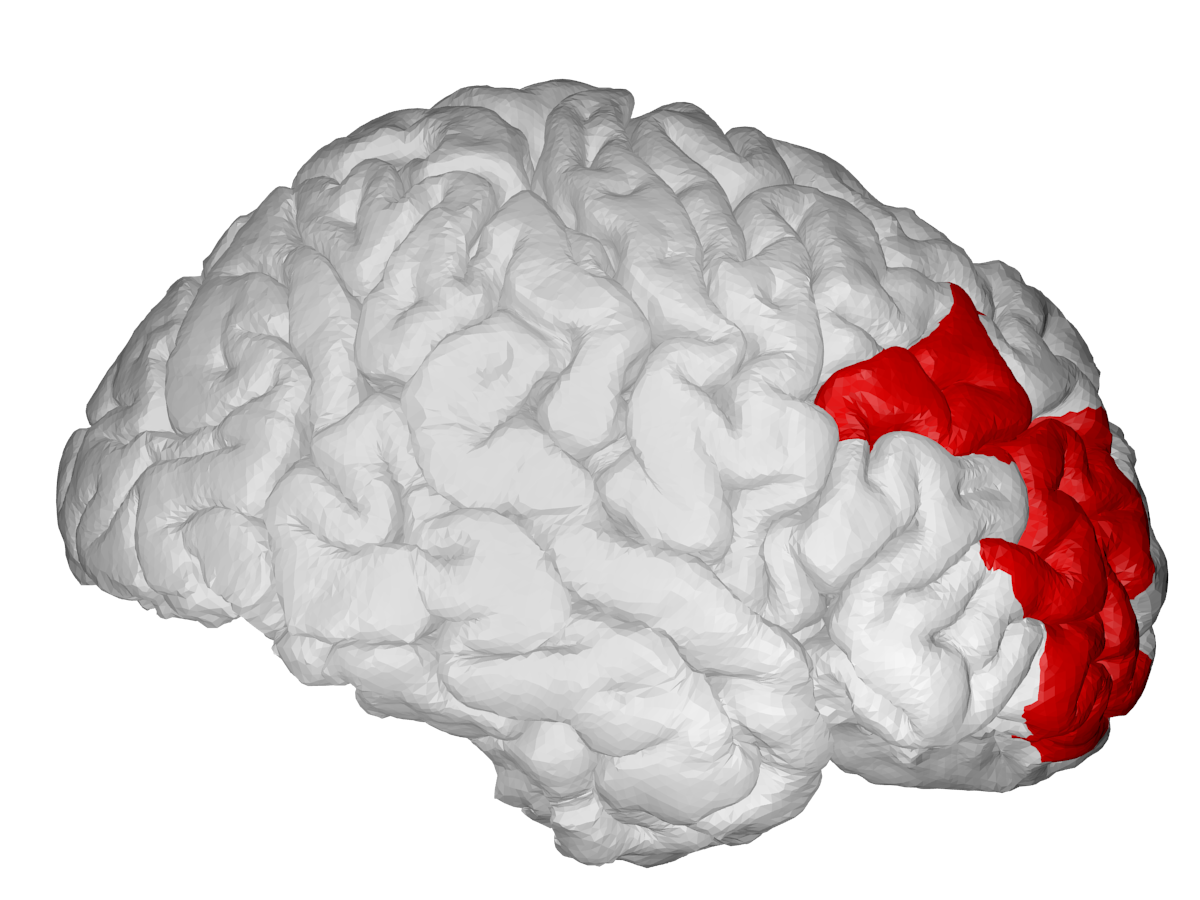
Rostral middle frontal gyrus.

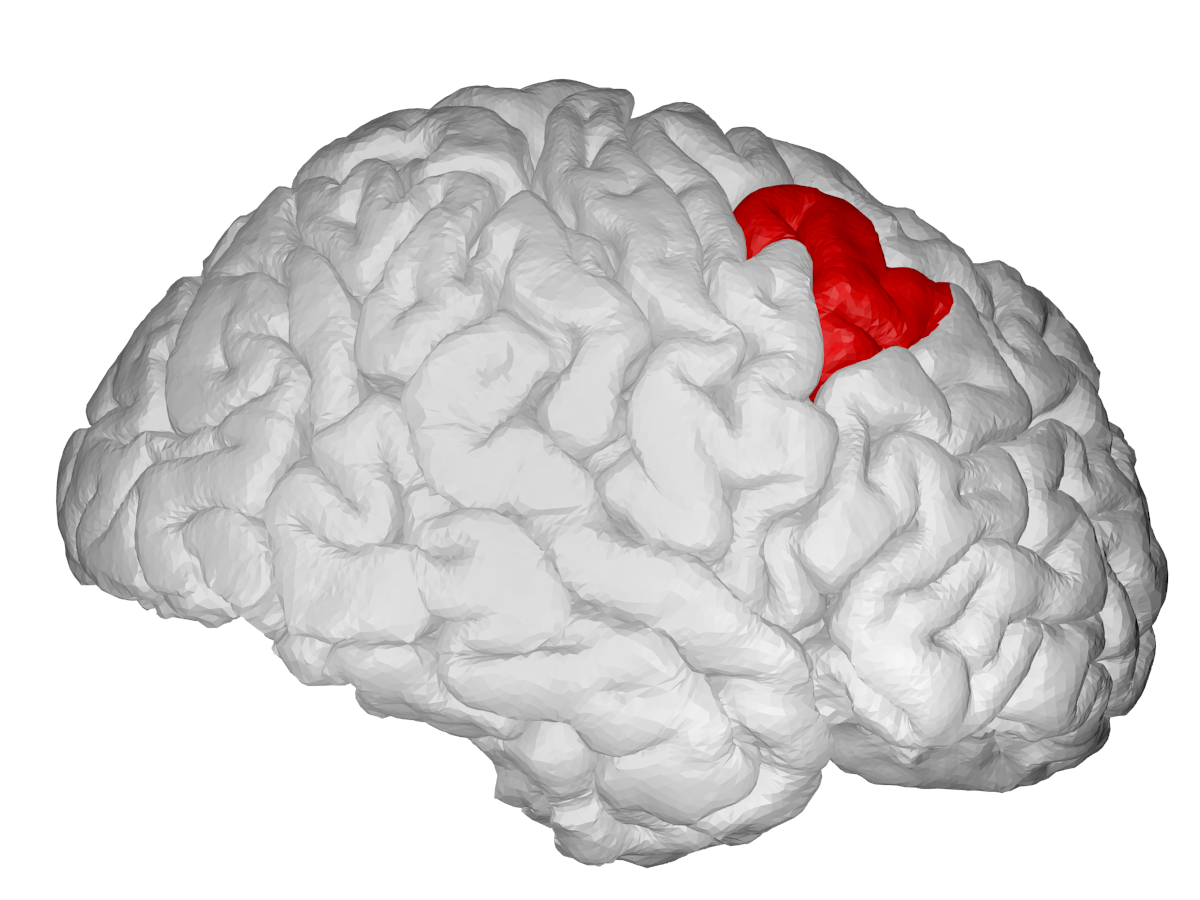
Caudal middle frontal gyrus.

Middle frontal gyrus highlighted in green on coronal T1 MRI images

Middle frontal gyrus highlighted in green on sagittal T1 MRI images

Middle frontal gyrus highlighted in green on transversal T1 MRI images
