= Straight gyrus =

Brain region

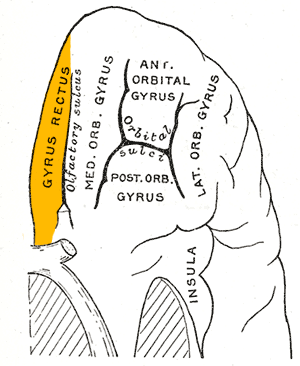
- Orbital surface of left frontal lobe. Straight gyrus is shown in orange.

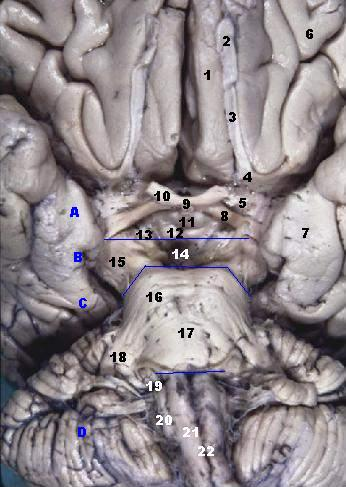
- Human brainstem anterior view. Straight gyrus is numbered as #1

Details

Identifiers
- Latin: gyrus rectus
- NeuroNames: 94
- NeuroLex ID: birnlex_1103
- TA98: A14.1.09.218
- TA2: 5462
- FMA: 61893

The portion of the inferior frontal lobe immediately adjacent to the longitudinal fissure (and medial to the medial orbital gyrus and olfactory tract) is named the straight gyrus,(or gyrus rectus) and is continuous with the superior frontal gyrus on the medial surface.

A specific function for the straight gyrus has not yet been brought to light; however, in males, greater activation of the straight gyrus within the medial orbitofrontal cortex while observing sexually visual pictures has been strongly linked to HSDD (hypoactive sexual desire disorder).

== Additional images ==
Animation. Straight gyrus is depicted as red.

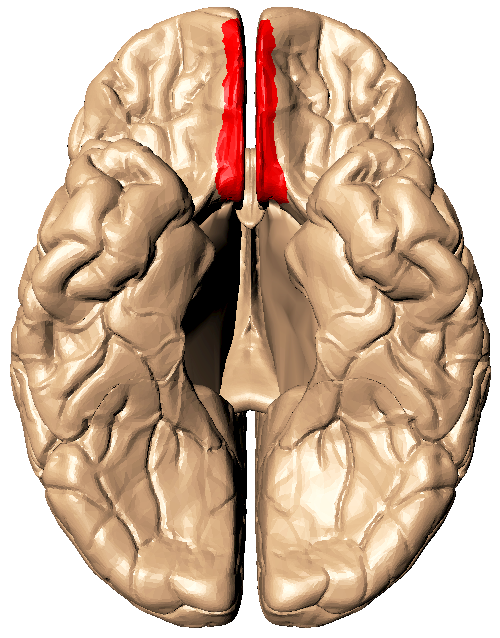
Basal surface of cerebrum. Straight gyrus is shown in red.

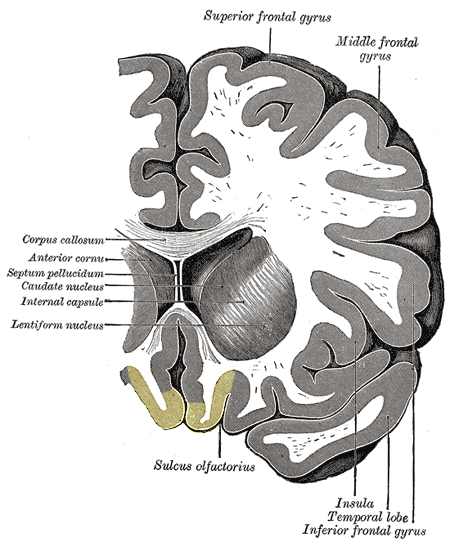
Coronal section of human brain. Straight gyrus depicted as yellow in center bottom.

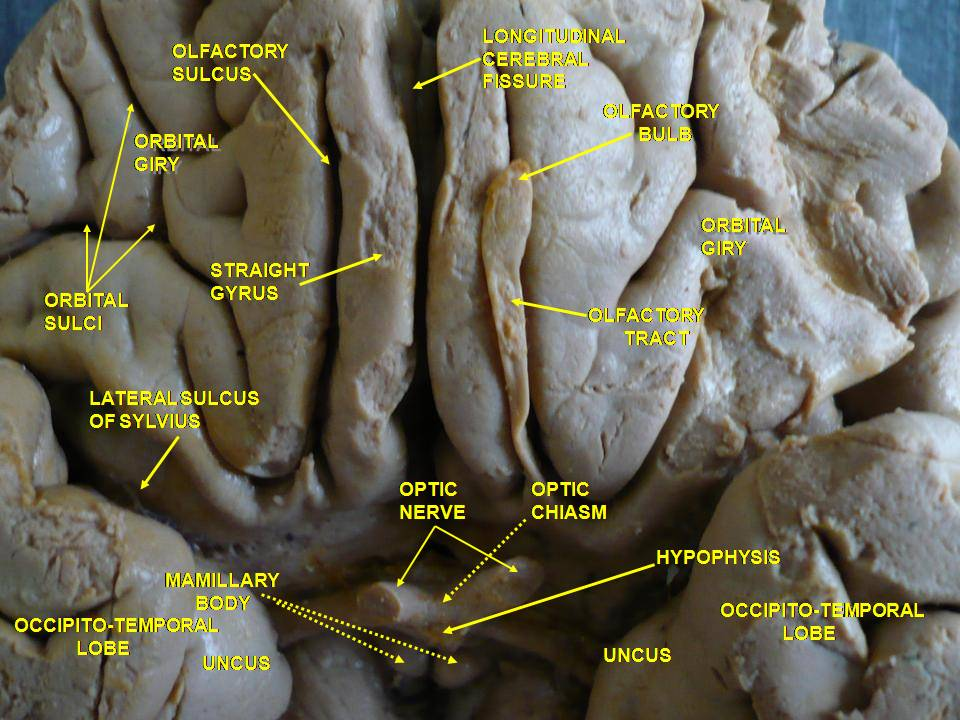
Cerebrum. Optic and olfactory nerves.Inferior view. Deep dissection.

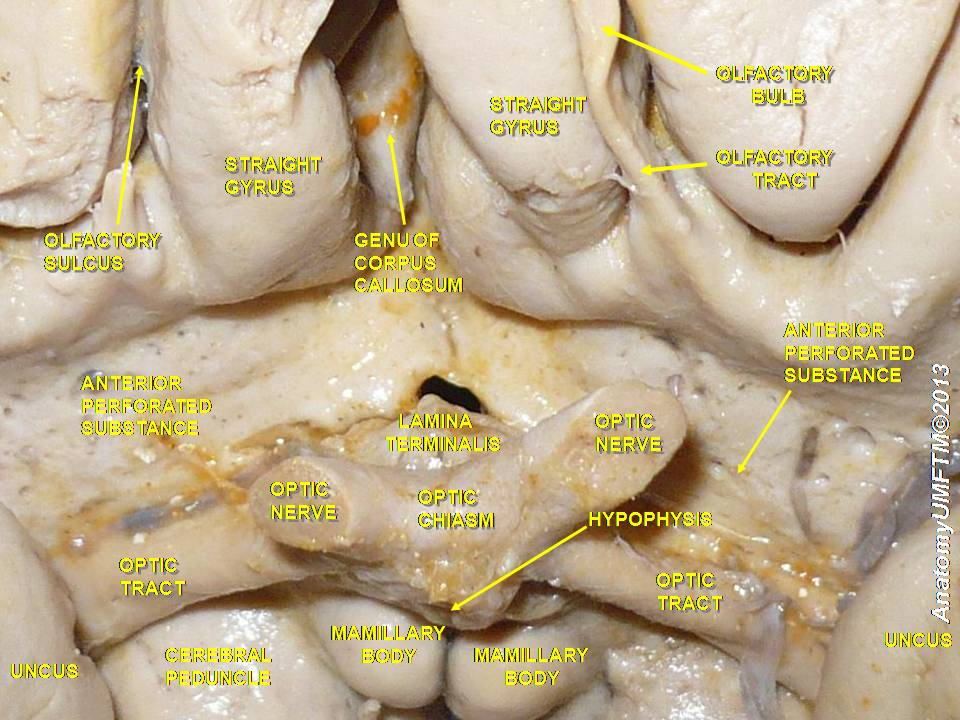
Cerebrum. Inferior view.Deep dissection

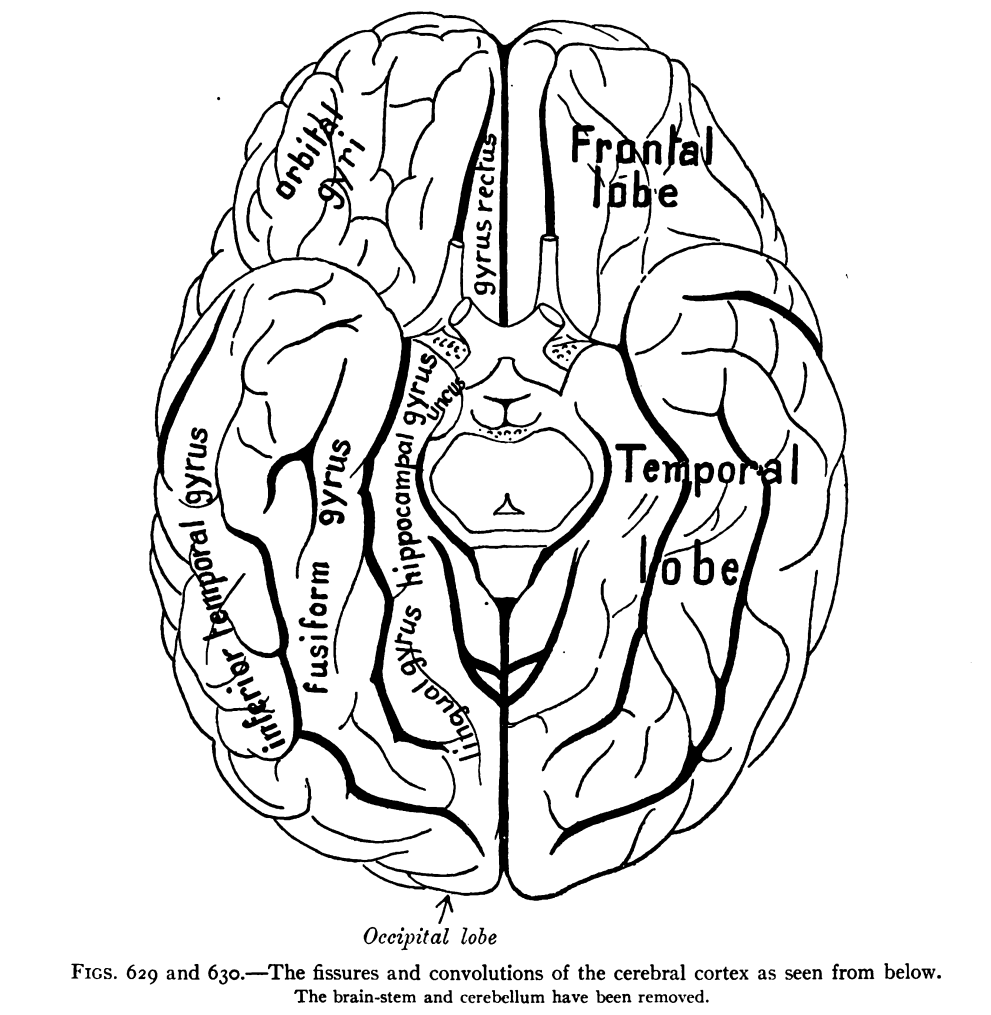
Gyrus rectus seen anteriorly at centre.

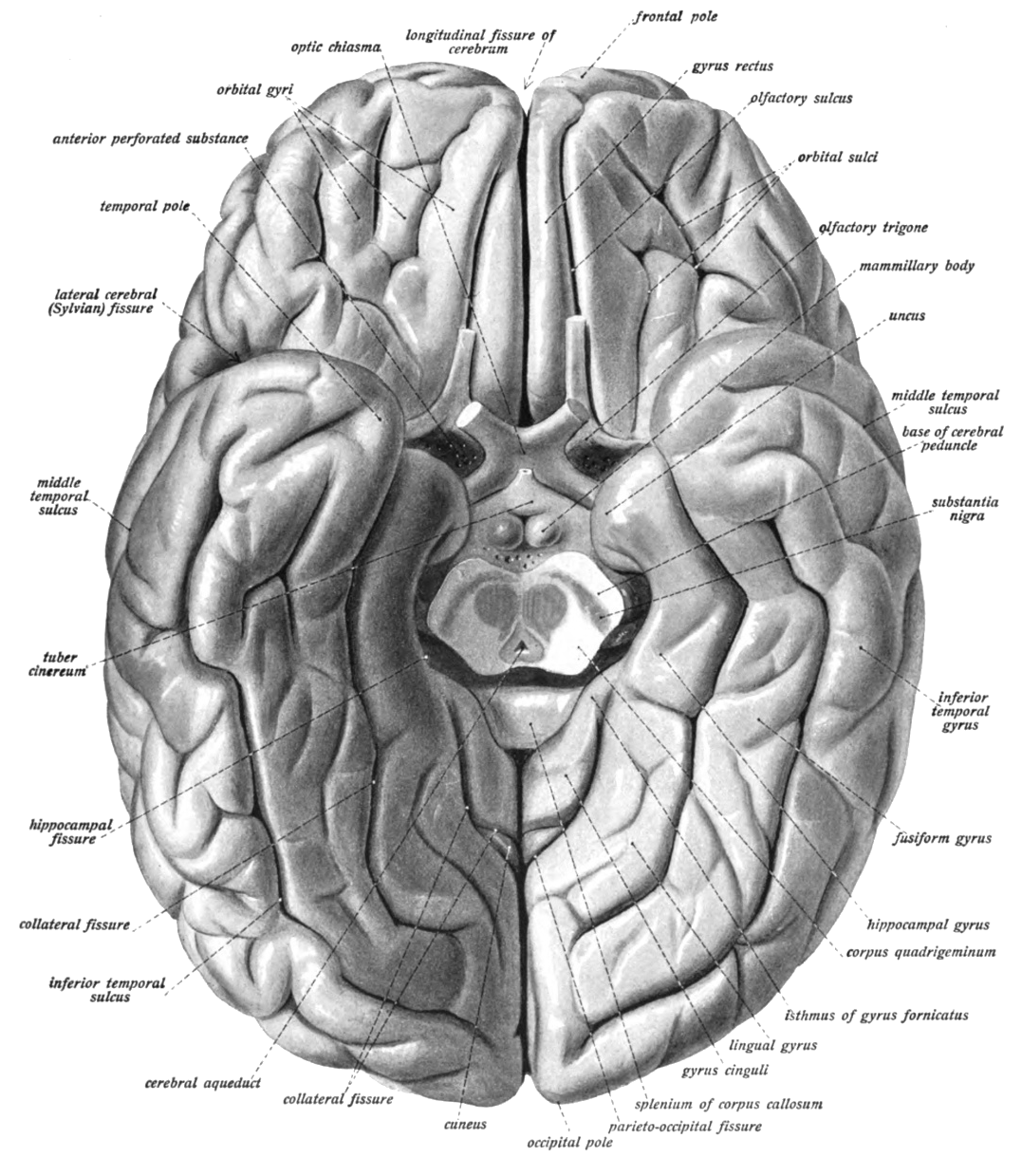
Gyrus rectus seen anteriorly at centre.
