= Hippocampal sulcus =

Fold in the surface of the brain

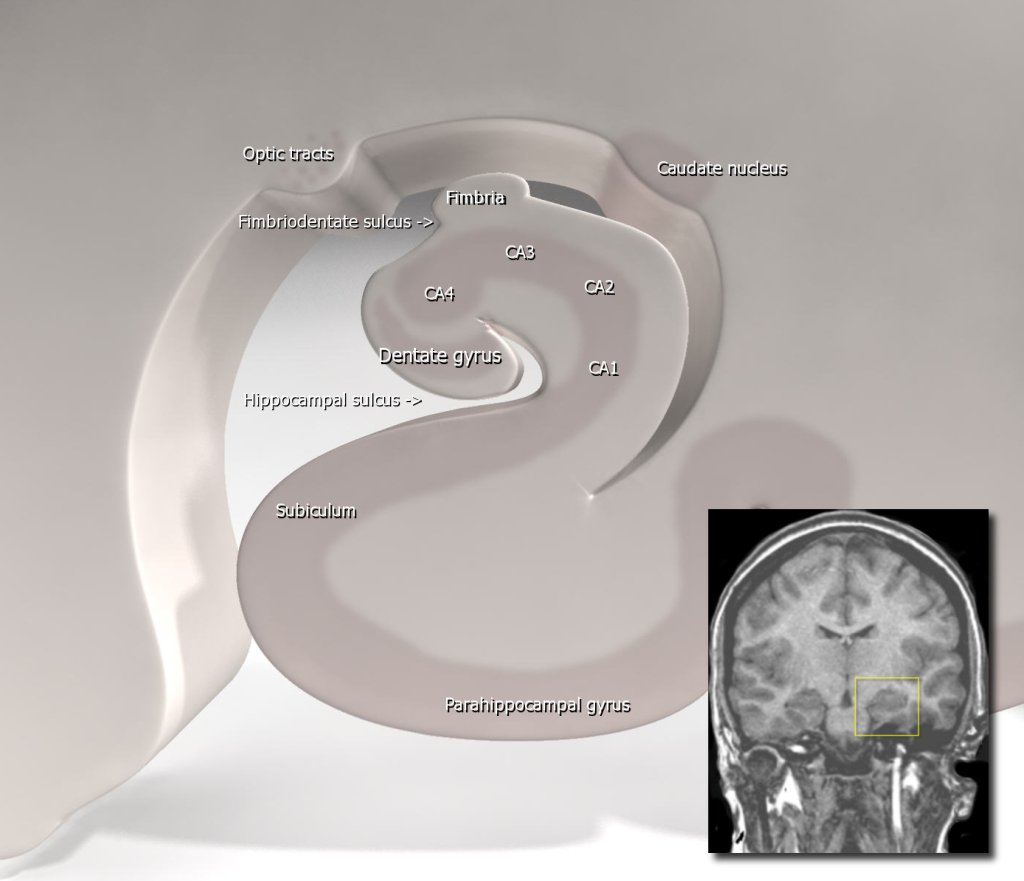
- Hippocampal sulcus labeled at center.

Details

Identifiers
- Latin: sulcus hippocampalis, sulcus hippocampi
- NeuroNames: 42
- NeuroLex ID: birnlex_4004
- TA98: A14.1.09.236
- TA2: 5522
- FMA: 83747

The hippocampal sulcus, also known as the hippocampal fissure, is a sulcus that separates the dentate gyrus from the subiculum and the CA1 field in the hippocampus.

== Development ==
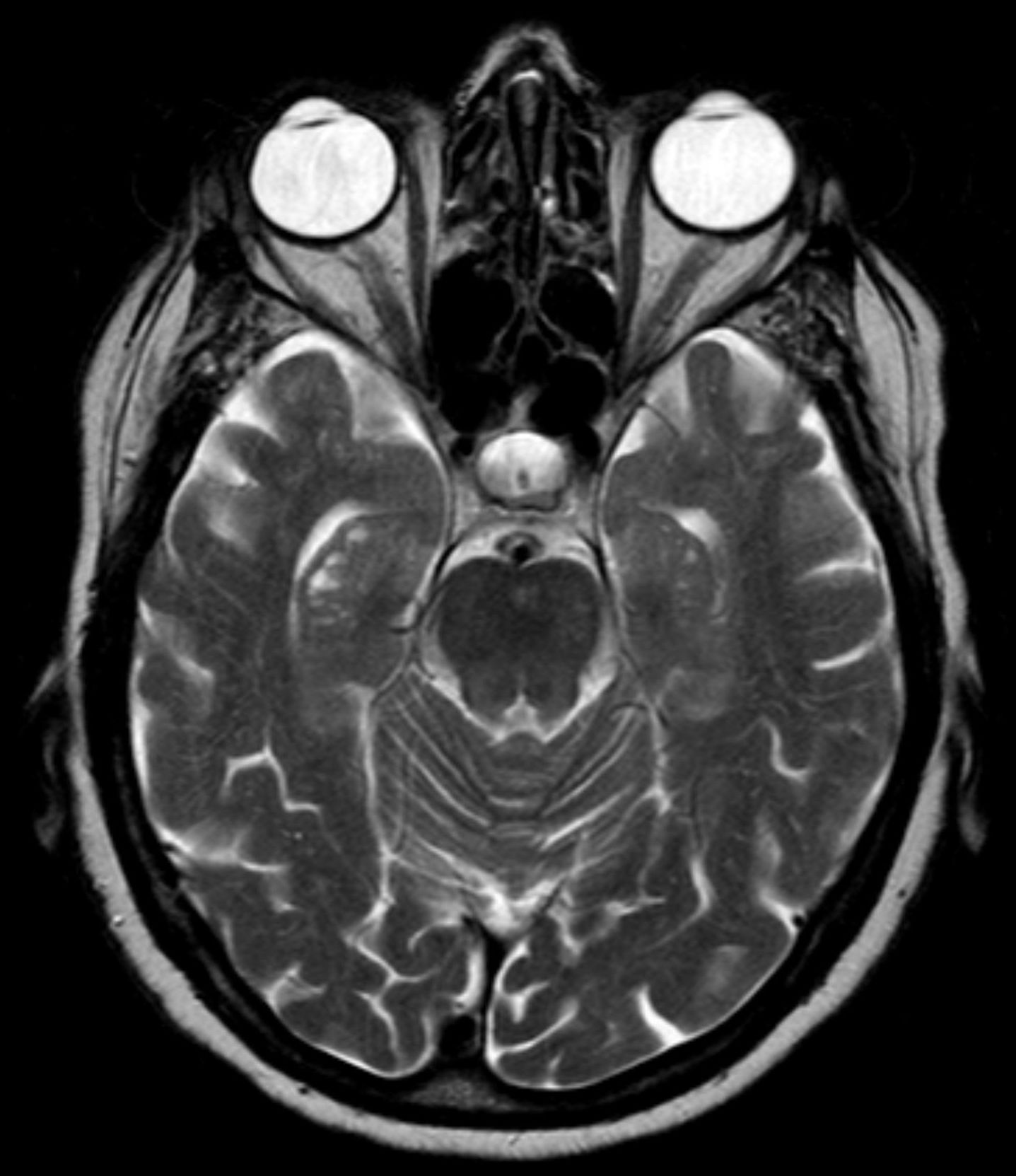
Hippocampal sulcus remnants seen on T2-weighted axial MRI image.

During human fetal development, the hippocampal sulcus first appears at approximately 10 weeks of gestational age. At this stage it exists as a broad shallow fissure along the surface of the dentate gyrus. Gradually, the fissure deepens and shifts toward the cornu ammonis. After about 18 weeks, the walls of the fissure fold into each other and begin to fuse. By 30 weeks, the hippocampal sulcus is normally obliterated except for its most medial part, leaving a shallow surface indentation.

== Clinical significance ==
Enlargement of the hippocampal sulcus has been associated with medial temporal lobe atrophy occurring in Alzheimer's disease.

== See also ==
- Hippocampus anatomy
