= Occipitotemporal sulcus =

Brain region in the temporal lobe

- Medial surface of left cerebral hemisphere. The picture shows a dashed outline in red, known as the occipitotemporal sulcus.

Details

Identifiers
- Latin: sulcus temporalis inferior
- NeuroNames: 130
- TA98: A14.1.09.147
- TA2: 5496
- FMA: 83784

The inferior surface of the temporal lobe is concave, and is continuous posteriorly with the tentorial surface of the occipital lobe. It is traversed by the occipitotemporal sulcus, also known as the lateral occipitotemporal sulcus which extends from near the occipital pole behind, to within a short distance of the temporal pole in front, but is frequently subdivided by bridging gyri.
