= Superior frontal sulcus =

Part of the brain

- Lateral surface of left cerebral hemisphere, viewed from the side.

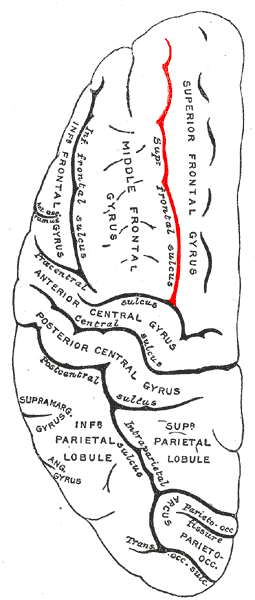
- Lateral surface of left cerebral hemisphere, viewed from above.

Details

Identifiers
- Latin: sulcus frontalis superior
- NeuroNames: 61
- NeuroLex ID: birnlex_1030
- TA98: A14.1.09.122
- TA2: 5455
- FMA: 83755

The superior frontal sulcus is a sulcus between the superior frontal gyrus and the middle frontal gyrus, that defines the lateral limit of the Superior frontal gyrus.

== See also ==
- Inferior frontal sulcus

== Additional images ==
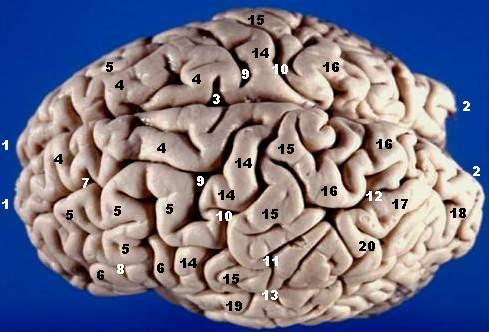
Human brain seen from top. Superior frontal sulcus labelled as #7.
