= Superior frontal gyrus =

Region of the frontal lobe of the brain

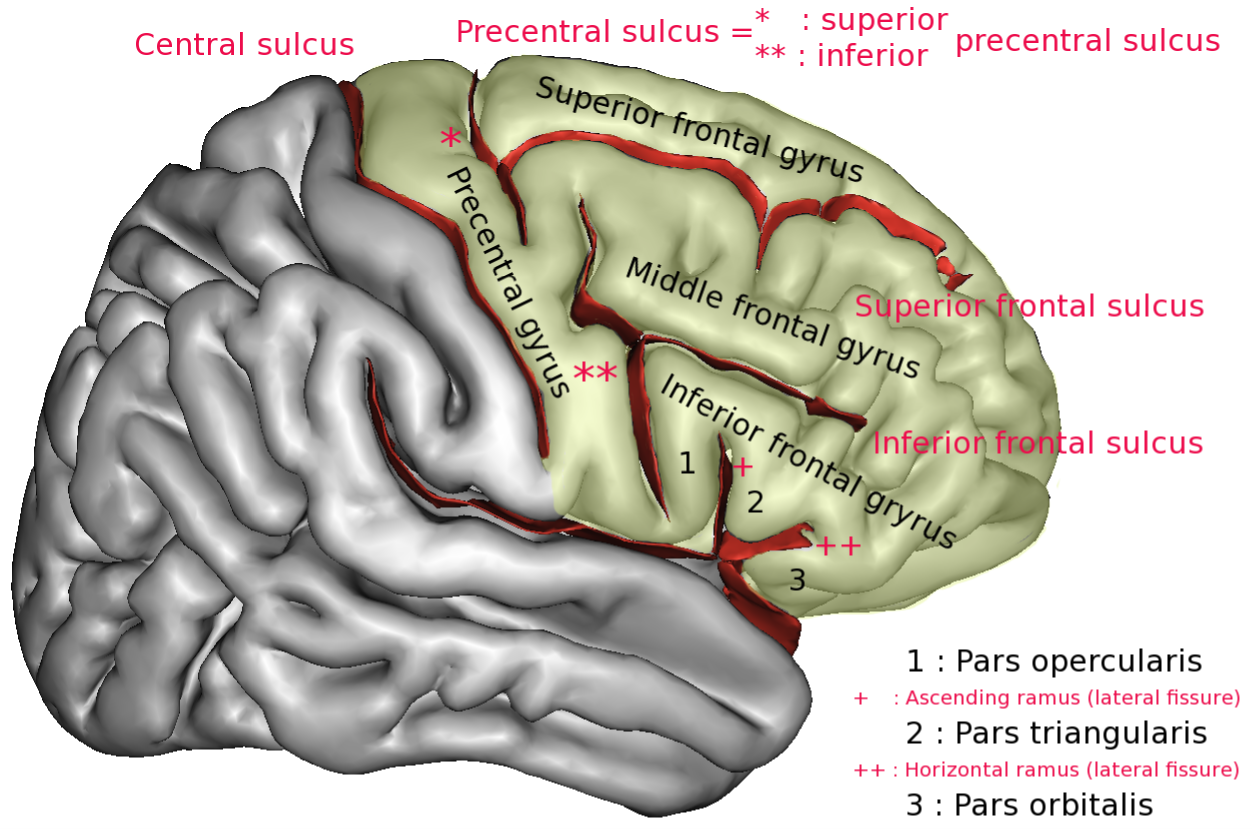
- Superior frontal gyrus of the human brain

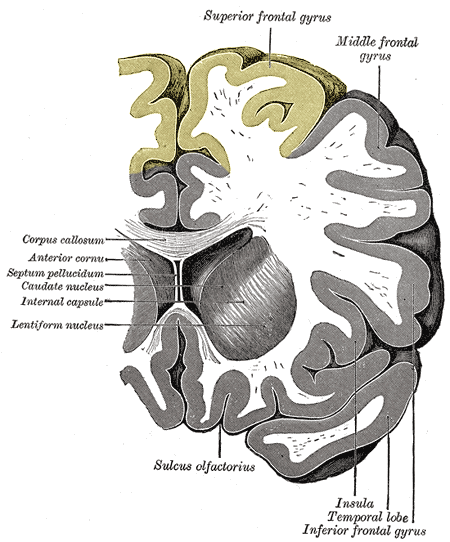
- Coronal section through anterior cornua of lateral ventricles. Superior frontal gyrus is shown as yellow.

Details
- Part of: Frontal lobe
- Artery: Anterior cerebral

Identifiers
- Latin: gyrus frontalis superior
- NeuroNames: 83
- NeuroLex ID: birnlex_1303
- TA98: A14.1.09.121
- TA2: 5456
- FMA: 61857

In neuroanatomy, the superior frontal gyrus (SFG, also marginal gyrus) is a gyrus – a ridge on the brain's cerebral cortex – which makes up about one third of the frontal lobe. It is bounded laterally by the superior frontal sulcus.

The superior frontal gyrus is one of the frontal gyri.

== Function ==
=== Self-awareness ===
In fMRI experiments, Goldberg et al. have found evidence that the superior frontal gyrus is involved in self-awareness, in coordination with the action of the sensory system.

The medial frontal gyrus (MFG) is the medial portion of the superior frontal gyrus. The MFG plays a crucial role implicated in self-reflection and self-awareness, particularly during self-referential processing. The MFG becomes activated when individuals engage in tasks that involve evaluating traits about themselves. This process is essential for maintaining a sense of self. In this study, people with major depressive disorder, also known as MDD, showed heightened and broader activation compared to healthy individuals, indicating that the connection between MDD and the medial frontal gyrus is shown through excessive self-awareness in depression that requires greater cognitive control. This heightened activation is often linked to persistent negative self-focused thoughts. While the medial frontal gyrus plays a role in self-awareness, it also demonstrates altered activity in depression that drives maladaptive self-reflection patterns, furthering the emotional distress and inability to shift focus from negative thoughts.

=== Language ===
The superior frontal gyrus (SFG) has been identified as a brain region that is crucial to language. The SFG is thought to be associated with language functions such as spontaneity and speech initiation. Research into the connection between the gyrus and language began after the tract connecting the SFG and Broca’s area was discovered and named the “frontal aslant tract”. As further research developed investigating this tract, a reciprocal corticocortical network between the two brain regions was revealed, indicating that the language system extends beyond the well-known Broca’s and Wernicke’s areas. The newfound importance of the SFG in language has prompted researchers to further evaluate the effects of transcranial magnetic stimulation (TMS) in patients with aphasia. A 2023 study found that in patients with aphasia, the treatment group that received speech and language therapy along with rTMS in the SFG exhibited greater treatment efficiency and language improvement than the sham group.

=== Laughter ===
In 1998, neurosurgeon Itzhak Fried described a 16-year-old female patient (referred to as "patient AK") who laughed when her SFG was stimulated with electric current during treatment for epilepsy. Electrical stimulation was applied to the cortical surface of AK's left frontal lobe while an attempt was made to locate the focus of her epileptic seizures (which were never accompanied by laughter).

Fried identified a 2 cm by 2 cm area on the left SFG where stimulation produced laughter consistently (over several trials). AK reported that the laughter was accompanied by a sensation of merriment or mirth. AK gave a different explanation for the laughter each time, attributing it to an (unfunny) external stimulus. Thus, laughter was attributed to the picture she was asked to name (saying "the horse is funny"), or to the sentence she was asked to read, or to persons present in the room ("you guys are just so funny... standing around").

Increasing the level of stimulation current increased the duration and intensity of laughter. For example, at low currents only a smile was present, while at higher currents a louder, contagious laughter was induced. The laughter was also accompanied by the stopping of all activities involving speech or hand movements.

=== Working memory ===
The superior frontal gyrus (SFG) may play a role in executive functions such as self-monitoring, working memory, organization, and planning. In a 2006 study, patients with left prefrontal lesions on the SFG exhibited poorer results on working memory tasks than the control group. Mapping showed the lateral and posterior portions of the SFG contributed the most to the working memory deficit (mostly in Brodmann area 8 in front of the frontal eye field). This study suggests the SFG is involved in executive processing.

== Clinical significance ==
Abnormalities in the superior frontal gyrus are implicated in emotional and behavioral symptoms. Atrophy in the superior frontal gyrus, characterized by decreased cortical thickness and gray matter volume, is associated with the severe irritability observed in youth with ADHD, disruptive mood dysregulation disorder, oppositional defiant disorder, and conduct disorder. Severe irritability is characterized by excessive sensitivity to negative emotional stimuli and impaired inhibition of anger and reactive aggression. In a 2022 study on depressed patients with severe anhedonia (the inability to feel pleasure), the left superior frontal gyrus was shown to have high efficiency as compared to depressed patients without anhedonia. This could indicate a compensatory mechanism in response to anhedonia and could serve as a potential biomarker of anhedonia in patients diagnosed with major depressive disorder. A 2023 study found a positive correlation between the cortical thickness of the superior frontal gyrus and social anxiety levels in participants with subthreshold social anxiety.

== Additional images ==
Position of superior frontal gyrus (shown in red)

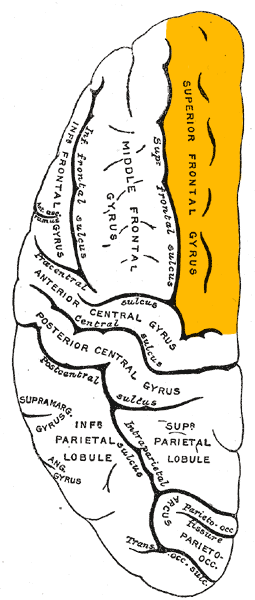
Left cerebral hemisphere seen from above

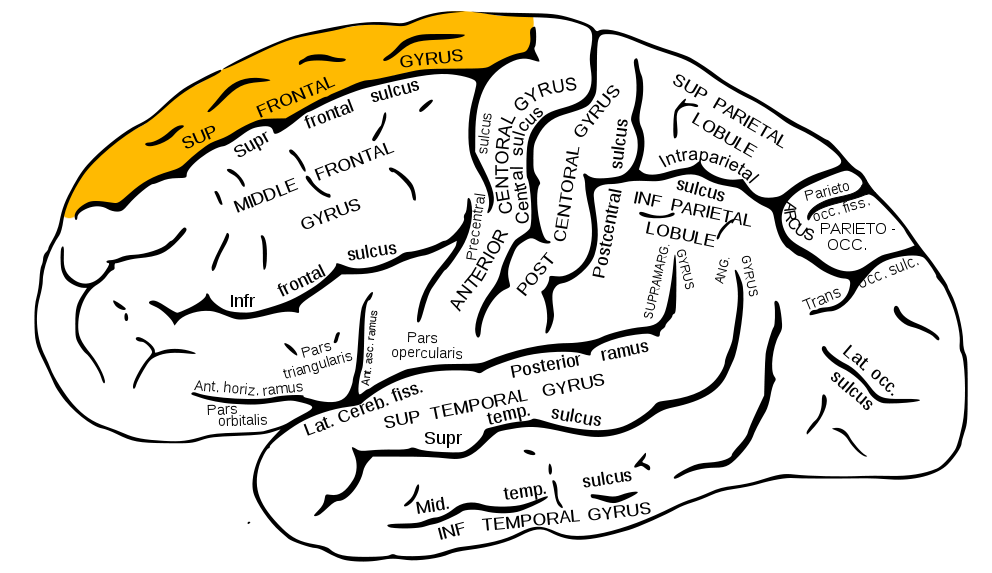
Lateral surface of left cerebral hemisphere

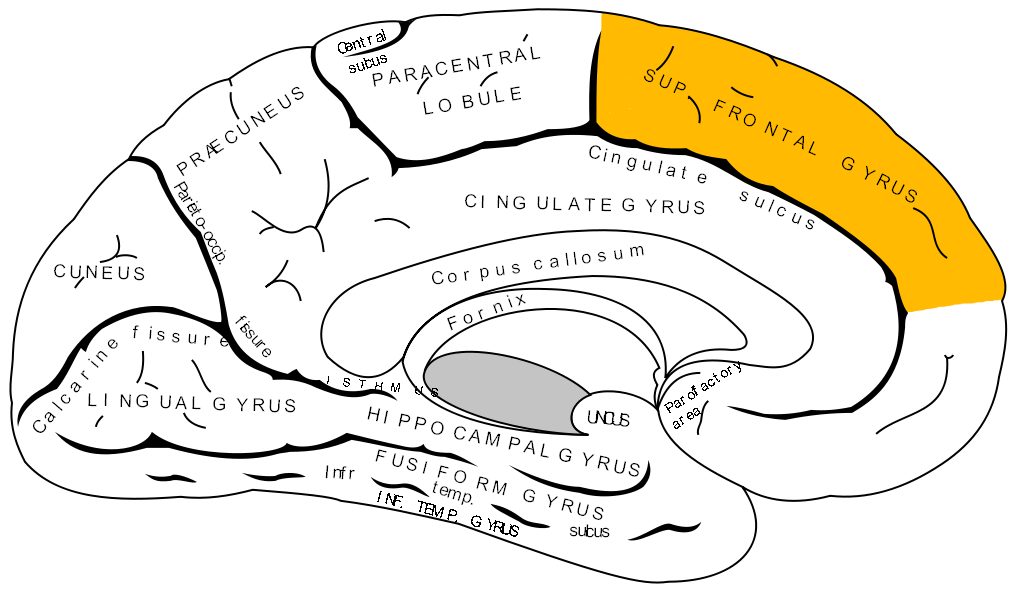
Medial surface of left cerebral hemisphere
