= Occipital face area =

Part of the human brain

Details
- System: Visual system
- Location: Occipital lobe

The occipital face area (OFA) is a region of the human cerebral cortex which is specialised for face perception. The OFA is located on the lateral surface of the occipital lobe adjacent to the inferior occipital gyrus. The OFA comprises a network of brain regions including the fusiform face area and posterior superior temporal sulcus which support facial processing.

The identification of the OFA emerged from neuroimaging studies, particularly functional magnetic resonance imaging and positron emission tomography, which revealed heightened neural activity in response to facial stimuli within this distinct cortical region.

== Structure ==
Like other regions of cerebral cortex, the OFA is functionally defined by using neuroimaging techniques to localise changes in neural activity in response to different face stimuli. Typically, participants will view different kinds of face stimuli which can be contrasted with scrambled images, letter strings or non-face objects to localise the OFA. While the exact location of the OFA varies between individuals and depends on the paradigm used, it usually corresponds to Brodmann areas 18 or 19. The OFA is positioned in close proximity to the fusiform face area and the superior temporal sulcus, forming a complex network crucial for facial processing.

== Function ==
The OFA is believed to be functionally necessary for some face computations. Lesion studies using patients with prosopagnosia show that brain damage overlapping with the OFA is associated with impaired facial recognition. Transcranial magnetic stimulation studies using healthy participants have shown that temporary inactivation of the OFA can produce deficits in various aspects of face perception including face recognition, face identity perception and facial feature processing.

Research indicates that the OFA primarily engages in the early stages of face perception, focusing on the structural aspects of faces, such as contours and basic features. While it is specialized for facial processing, the OFA is not exclusively dedicated to this function, as studies suggest its involvement in processing non-face objects as well. The interaction between the OFA and other face-selective regions contributes to the holistic understanding of facial stimuli.

Compared to lower visual cortical areas such as V1, the OFA is believed to support face processing by representing higher-order features such as faces or facial features compared with lower-order features such as edges or contours. For example, it has been suggested that the OFA may represent faces using a topographic face map whereby neighbouring areas of the cortical surface reflect physically neighbouring regions of a face. These representations likely emerge as a result of feedback connections between neighbouring cortical areas such as the OFA and fusiform face area which provide fine-grained analysis and a general face-template respectively. This suggestion is supported by evidence of reciprocal connectivity between the OFA and fusiform face area, among other regions of visual cortex.

=== Patient P.S. ===
Examining case studies of individuals with lesions to the OFA provides more insight into the functional role of the OFA. Prosopagnosic patients have been essential for this initiative, especially patient P.S., a right handed woman with a lesion extending from the posterior part of the right inferior occipital gyrus into the posterior fusiform gyrus. This lesion left patient P.S. without a right OFA and she exhibited great difficulty with facial recognition in daily life and facial gender discrimination, and could not match unfamiliar faces seen from different viewing angles. Despite the extensive cortical damage she suffered, patient P.S. exhibited a normal right fusiform face area when compared to age matched controls using a standard functional magnetic resonance imaging localizer. She was unimpaired with basic-level and within-class object discrimination and recognition tasks. Results like these demonstrate that face information can still be processed in the right fusiform face area despite the absence of the right OFA, thus suggesting the presence of alternate cortical routes between the early visual cortex and fusiform gyrus.

== See also ==
- Face perception
- Outline of object recognition
