= Occipital sulcus =

Occipital sulcus may refer to:

- Lateral occipital sulcus
- Parieto-occipital sulcus
- Transverse occipital sulcus
