= Sensory enhancement theory of object-based attention =

The sensory enhancement theory assumes that attentional resources will spread until they reach the boundaries of a cued object, including regions that may be obstructed or are overlapping other objects. It has been suggested that sensory enhancement is an essential mechanism that underlies object-based attention. The sensory enhancement theory of object-based attention proposes that when attention is directed to a cued object, the quality of the object’s physical representations improve because the spread of attention facilitates the efficiency of processing the features of the object as a whole. The qualities of the cued object, such as spatial resolution and contrast sensitivity, are therefore more strongly represented in one's memory than the qualities of other objects or locations that received little or no attentional resource. Information processing of these objects also tends to be significantly faster and more accurate as the representations have become more salient.

== Evidence of sensory enhancement ==
=== Single-cell recordings ===
Single-cell recordings experiments were the first experiments to support the presence of sensory enhancement. V1 neurons in monkeys were measured for neural responses by Roelfsema, Lamme & Spekreijse (1998), while the monkeys performed a curve-tracing task. The neurons were found to be more active when their receptor fields were on the target-curve as opposed to when their receptor fields fell on the distractor-curve. Furthermore, enhancement was present in the neurons whose receptor fields were on segments of the target-curve relative to segments of the distractor-curve. This effect occurred regardless of whether the curves were spatially separate or overlapping. The presence of neural enhancement when the neurons receptor fields fell on the target-curve could suggest that attention is spreading to the boundaries of the object and then stopping. More recently, Roelfesema and Houtkamp (2011) found that there was a time difference in the onset of enhancement in these V1 neurons. The enhancement of the neuron took longer to appear as the spatial distance between the fixation of attention and receptor field increased. This finding is supported by the performance of mental curve tracing tasks in humans. The results of these single cell recording studies therefore suggest that attention when deployed within an object enhances the representations of the object as a whole and this process of enhancement is gradual so it takes time to complete.

Attention to an object or surface has been directly linked by Wannig, Rodrίguez and Freiwald (2007) to increased neural activation of representations in the early sensory areas. They found support for the enhancement of targets when motion sensitive neurons in the middle temporal (MT) areas of monkey brains were activated during a cued transparent random-dot surface task. As there was more activation in the MT region when there was a motion related to the attended surface or object as opposed to the unattended surface or object, even though the two surfaces were overlapping.

=== Event-related potential (ERPs) ===
Evidence from numerous event-related potential (ERPs) studies have found that there is an enhancement of objects when attention is focused on them. This is associated with an N1 enhancement over the occipital-temporal areas. However, a study by Martίnez, Teder-Sälejärvi, Vazquez, Moholm, Foxe, Javitt, Russo, Worden and Hillyard (2006) found that although there was N1 enhancement in this region, the enhancements relating to object-based attention were smaller in N1 amplitude than the enhancement for space-based attention.

=== Functional magnetic imaging (fMRI) ===
Converging evidence of sensory enhancement has been found in functional magnetic resonance imaging (fMRI) studies. A study by O'Craven, Downing and Kanwisher (1999) found that when their participants attended to one attribute (face or house) this led to an enhancement of the blood oxygenation level dependent (BOLD) signal change in the area of the brain that was responsible for processing that specific attribute as well as the brain region that is associated with processing task-irrelevant attributes that belong to the attended as opposed to the unattended object. Neural activation related to attributes that were not relevant to the task differed in relation to whether the attribute belonged to the attended or unattended object which supports sensory enhancement. It would suggest that attention is enhancing the neural representations of the objects attributes as a whole regardless of the relevance to the task.

Arrington, Carr, Mayer and Rao (2000) found additional support for sensory enhancement. They found that when an individual was attending to a region of space that was bound by an object it induced stronger brain activity as opposed to when they were attending to an empty space, not bound together by an object. Thus giving evidence that could indicate that object-based selection could be utilising additional mental resources on top of location-based spatial selection. In saying this, the results of the fMRI studies do not examine whether the degree of enhanced activation is equal in all aspects of the attended object, it just shows that there is enhancement for the object as a whole.

== Neural correlates ==
=== Associations with the early visual cortex ===
Mϋller and Kleinschmidt (2003) looked at the early retinotopic visual areas to see if they play a role in object-based attention. They found that when an individual focused on a spatial cued there was retinotopic activity in the V1, V2, V3 and V4 areas that represented locations outside the cued region, suggesting that information from these regions is also being processed. These regions were however enhanced when these locations were bound to the cued area by a common object that extended beyond the originally cued region. This finding could support the argument for sensory enhancement, as the attention of the individual was extending to the boundaries of the object. They also found that the neural responses in these early visual regions where controlled by these object-based effects.

=== Neuropsychological findings: a case study ===
Patient D.F. has defined bilateral lesions to the lateral occipital (LO) areas of her brain. She presented with normal covert spatial attention and thus could mentally focus on a specific sensory stimuli. However, when her spatial attention was tested it was found that when she focused her attention selectively during a task, she was not sensitive to the presentation of objects. The results of the study by de-Wir, Kentridge and Milner (2009) found that although the basic figure-ground segmentation was not effected in D.F., she was still unable to influence the spread of her attentional resources over an object as a whole. This resulted in her having a fragmented representation of the object that was present in the area she had focused her attention, whereas an individual with normal object-based attention processing should have a complete representation due to sensory enhancement. The lack of any object-based effects in tasks could therefore suggest that the LO region plays a key role in object-based attention.

== Alternate mechanisms that could modulate object-based attention ==
Two alternate mechanisms have been proposed, in addition to sensory enhancement, to modulate object-based attention: attentional prioritization and attentional shifting.

=== Attentional prioritization ===
Unlike sensory enhancement, attentional prioritization suggests that the order in which spatial locations or objects are scanned during a visual search will influence how well they are processed. In the case of a cued object, attention by default will be deployed to the object and processing will begin within the attended object and thus later recall of the objects qualities will be relatively better than the recall for objects that were further away from the cue.

=== Attentional shifting ===
Attentional shifting is based on visual demand, as it is more demanding to shift attention between objects than it is to shift attention within an object. The increase in demand when attention is moved between objects requires an additional disengagement of processing operations in order to move attention to an object beyond the one that is being attended to. Memory for an object as a whole could be more accurate because it is more cost effective to completely process an area bound by an object than it is to rapidly shift attentional resources between two or more objects. This is because information about the newly attended object may not be processed because of the disengagement of processing operations as the visual system refocuses on the new location.
