= Area 19 =

Area 19 may refer to:

- Brodmann area 19, in the human brain
- Area 19 (Nevada National Security Site), in the United States
