= Object-based attention =

Object-based attention refers to the relationship between an ‘object’ representation and a person’s visually stimulated, selective attention, as opposed to a relationship involving either a spatial or a feature representation; although these types of selective attention are not necessarily mutually exclusive. Research into object-based attention suggests that attention improves the quality of the sensory representation of a selected object, and results in the enhanced processing of that object’s features.

The concept of an ‘object’, apropos object-based attention, entails more than a physical thing that can be seen and touched. It includes a perceptual unit or group, namely, elements in a visual field (stimuli) organised coherently by Gestalt factors such as collinearity, closure, and symmetry.

== History ==
Early researchers initially postulated that space-based considerations were the driving force behind visual attention; however, it became evident that their views needed to include the “thing” that attention selects. This object-based focus was extended, from Kahneman & Henik’s leading question: “If attention selects a stimulus, what is the stimulus it selects?” and their consideration that attention might also be object-driven, through Duncan’s influential and explicit delineation between space-based and object-based theories of attention, to the current status presented in this article. A classic example of a cuing study undertaken to evaluate object-based attention was that of Egly, Driver, and Rafal. Their results demonstrated that it was quicker to detect a target that was located on a cued object than it was to locate the target when it was the same distance away, but on an uncued object.

Pertinently, Duncans’s efforts were later verified by Vecera & Farah’s findings that shape discrimination tasks are dependent upon object-based representations, which in turn result in object-based attentional effects.

The contribution of object-based attentional guidance to visual processing is widely accepted, with both object-based and space-based perceptual representations now included in recent models of visual attentional selection.

== Nature and effects of object-based attention ==
When considering the nature and effects of object-based attention, three research theories are commonly mentioned; these are presented below. Consideration is then given to the enhancing effect of object-based attention on memory, and its inhibitory effect during certain kinds of visual search.

=== Distribution of attention ===
The first theory posits that visually perceived objects affect the distribution of conscious and unconscious attention. Therefore, consciously attending to one aspect of an object automatically facilitates the processing of other aspects of the same object (including those currently task-irrelevant), whether in terms of accuracy or response times. When a visual search involves locating two features, it is more efficient when both of the features occur in the same object, as opposed to two features separated in two different objects. Furthermore, that when re-viewing a previously attended object, recognition is faster when there is continuity between the representations (form, colour, orientation, etc.) of that object and the previewed one.

=== Orienting ===
The second theory asserts that object-based attention can shift quicker within an object than between objects. Egly and colleagues provided evidence for an object-based component of such visual orienting in a cued reaction time task involving both normal participants and parietal-damaged patients. As an extension, research has indicated that when looking for a target among objects, there is also a preference to make eye-shifts within the same object, rather than between objects.

=== Distractors ===
The third theory contends that there is greater interference of object-based attention when any flanking distractors (e.g., visual scene crowding or noise) are present. Particularly, if these distractors belong to the same object or object-group as that being attended (noise similar), as opposed to coming from different objects (noise dissimilar)—irrespective of the distinguishing characteristics of the objects themselves (e.g., colour, motion direction, shape, orientation). An influencing element is that an object-like representation can engage attention even when it is not the intended target of a visual search. Therefore, an important consideration is that the perceptual resemblance between distractors and a target object influences the efficiency of visual search; increases in similarity among the distractors, increases search efficiency. Similarly, visual search efficiency increases the less similar the target is to the distractors.

=== Memory ===
The effect of object-based attention on memory has also received increasing attention. Three experiments conducted by Bao and colleagues have shown that the binding of different information to a single object improves the manipulation of that information within working memory, suggesting a relationship between outer visual attention and internal memory attention. Research into object-based exogenous attention has also identified concurrent enhancement of recognition memory, thereby enabling better information retrieval. This occurred when the memory formation was encoded simultaneously with a change in an accompanying task-irrelevant visual scene, provided they are both presented in the attended object.

=== Inhibition of return ===
Object-based attention has also been found to have inhibitory qualities. Posner and Cohen unexpectedly found that visual search reaction times to detect objects appearing in a previously cued location took longer than when they appeared in a non-cued location, provided the time in waiting for the target (object) to appear was longer than 300 ms after the initial cueing. This was termed the inhibition of return paradigm: “An inhibitory effect produced by a peripheral (i.e., exogenous) cue or target”. Klein hypothesised that inhibition of return is a mechanism that allows a person not to re-search in previously searched visual fields as a result of “inhibitory tags”.

== Factors that influence object-based attention ==
The deployment of attention depends jointly on the goals and expectations of the observer, and the properties of the image.

=== Cues and attentional focus ===
The kind of cues—exogenous (peripheral) or endogenous (central)—have been found to differentially affect the role of object-based attention in visual searches. Chen reported that object-based effects were found with exogenous but not with endogenous cues. However, further research into this finding suggests that it is rather the extent of attentional focus that a cue evokes that influences the functioning of an object-based effect, than the kind of cue used. Object effects are less elusive when the peripheral nature of exogenous cues is responsible for stimulating the use of a broad focus of attention vis-à-vis the narrow attentional focus generally induced by central-type cues. Confirmatory findings in the ‘extent of attentional focus’ versus ‘type of cue’ debate by Chen & Cave, and others, have shown that object-based effects are also evident in the case of endogenous cues when research-participants adopt a broad attentional focus while attending to the cues.

=== Representational quality ===
The perceptual representation of an object must be sufficiently defined (a viable object representation) in order for object-based attention to be elicited and used in a visual search. Some factors that might influence the quality of such a representation are: The duration of a stimulus that is presented in order to produce an object-based perceptual representation—longer durations are generally more reliable; the more ‘complete’ the object-based representation the better, e.g., a closed as opposed to a disconnected outline; greater uniformity in the representation of an object is also more effective, e.g., consistency in colouration and luminance throughout the representation; the amount of perceptual load, as it has a modulatory effect on object-based attention, for, with a low perceptual load, attention spreads along the cued object—an outcome that supports an object-based attention account.

== Mechanisms that evoke object-based attentional effects ==
The visual system does not have the capacity to process all inputs simultaneously; therefore, attentional processes assist to select some inputs over others. Such selection can be based on spatial locations as well as discrete objects. Three mechanisms are hypothesised to contribute to selective attention to an object.

=== Sensory enhancement ===
Object-based attentional effects are attributed to the improved sensory representation of the object that results from attentional spread (an object-guided spatial selection). When attention is directed to a location within an object, other locations within that object also acquire an attentional advantage (via enhanced sensory processing). Two or more features belonging to a single object are identified more quickly and more accurately than are features belonging to different objects. Attention to a single visual feature of an object, such as its speed of motion, results in an automatic transfer of attention to other task-relevant features, such as, colour. Studies measuring neuron response in animals provided evidence supporting the theory that attention spreads within an object.

=== Attentional prioritisation ===
It is held that the order of a visual search is important in the manifestation of object-based effects. The object-based attentional advantage could be mediated by increased attentional priority assigned to locations within an already attended object, namely, where a visual search starts by default from locations within an already attended object. This prioritisation account proposes that the main effect of attention is to order the analysis of attentional search, and that the attended object is processed ahead of unattended objects, and more specifically, that currently unattended portions of an attended object will be searched ahead of currently unattended portions of a different, unattended object. However, it is also proposed that observers adopt either an implicit configural scanning strategy (unattended locations within an attended object receive a high priority) or an implicit contextual scanning strategy (where objectively high probability locations receive a high priority) depending on the requirements of, and time availability for, a task.

=== Attentional shifting ===
Lamy and Egeth found object-based attentional effects when attentional shifts during tasks were required, but no attentional effects when the shifts were not required. Attentional shifting theorises that the cost of switching between objects, rather than within objects, occurs due to three individual components. These being the attentional operations that take place when attention needs to be: Disengaged (released) from a current object; redirected (switched) to another location outside the initial object of attention; and then re-engaged (the refocusing of attention) on the new object. Furthermore, Brown and Denney identified that within the three stages it took longer response times to disengage attention from an object than it did to disengage attention from a location, or to shift attention within an object; they proposed that separate processes could be involved when shifting attention from an object than doing so from a location.

== Neural correlates of object-based attention ==
When attention moves between spatially superimposed perceptual objects, such as faces and houses, event-related functional magnetic resonance imaging (fMRI) has revealed transient transfer activity in posterior parietal and frontoparietal regions; the latter region controls spatial attention. The time-course of cortical activity demonstrates the functional role that these brain regions fulfil in attentional control processes.

In a recent study Baldauf and Desimone show that a region in frontal cortex, the inferior-frontal junction (IFJ), is involved in the top-down guidance of object-based attention by selectively synchronizing its neural activity with respective networks in IT cortex representing relevant object information. It is thought that object-based attention effects are mediated in the ventral stream, which is the visual stream associated with object recognition and form representation. This prediction is on the basis of a model of visual systems in which shape representations in the ventral stream inform perception, whereas shape representations in the dorsal stream guide actions.

A 2009 case study involving “DF”, who had suffered bilateral damage to the lateral occipital lobe (LO) area of her ventral visual stream, showed that while she had a normal spatial orienting system, her deployment of attention was not at all sensitive to the presentation of objects. DF did not exhibit the usual advantage for within- over between-object attentional shifts or figure comparisons, a clear indicator of the absence of normal object-based attentional effects.
