= Mid-fusiform sulcus =

Details

Identifiers
- Latin: sulcus sagittalis gyri fusiformis

The mid-fusiform sulcus is a shallow sulcus that divides the fusiform gyrus into lateral and medial partitions. Functionally, the MFS divides both large-scale functional maps and identifies fine-scale functional regions such as the anterior portion of the fusiform face area.

== Anatomy ==
Cytoarchitectonically, the lateral and medial sides of the MFS are dissociable. The anterior and posterior portion of the MFS also have different long-range connections. The vertical occipital fasciculus terminates in the posterior aspects of the MFS, while the arcuate fasciculus terminates in the anterior portions of the MFS.

== History ==
The mid-fusiform sulcus was first identified in 1896 by Gustav Retzius. Retzius is known for many other discoveries such as Cajal–Retzius cells. He first identified the MFS as the sulcus sagittalis gyri fusiformis. Since his label, there have been several other proposed labels, but the MFS nomenclature is the most widely accepted in present day.
