= Extrastriate cortex =

Region of the brain's occipital cortex

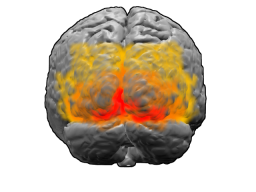
- Extrastriate cortex is shown in yellow on this picture of a brain (Brodmann area 19) and orange (Brodmann area 18). Striate cortex (Brodmann area 17) is shown in red.

Details

Identifiers
- Latin: area extrastriata
- NeuroLex ID: nlx_anat_200905010

The extrastriate cortex is the region of the occipital cortex of the mammalian brain located next to the primary visual cortex. Primary visual cortex (V1) is also named striate cortex because of its striped appearance in the microscope. The extrastriate cortex encompasses multiple functional areas, including V3, V4, V5/MT, which is sensitive to motion, or the extrastriate body area (EBA) used in the perception of human bodies.

== Anatomy ==
In terms of Brodmann areas, the extrastriate cortex comprises Brodmann area 18 and Brodmann area 19, while the striate cortex comprises Brodmann area 17.

In primates, the extrastriate cortex includes visual area V3, visual area V4, and visual area MT (sometimes called V5), while V1 corresponds to the striate cortex, and V2 to the prestriate cortex.

== See also ==
- List of regions in the human brain
