= Heinrich Sachs =

German neurologist and neuroanatomist

Heinrich Sachs (1863–1928) was a late 19th and early 20th century German neurologist and neuroanatomist best known for his atlas of the brain's white matter.

== Scientific career ==
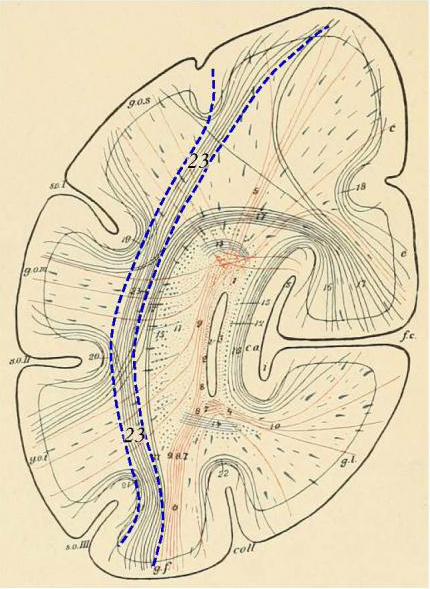
Drawing of connections in the human brain, from Heinrich Sachs, The White Matter of the Human Cerebrum: Part I, 1892.

Heinrich Sachs was born in Halberstadt, Province of Saxony, Kingdom of Prussia, in 1863. He studied medicine in Berlin, graduating in 1885 with a dissertation on amyotrophic lateral sclerosis. After practicing as a physician for a few years, he joined neuropathologist Carl Wernicke's laboratory at University Hospital, Breslau, where he studied spatial perception and gained a postdoctoral qualification (habilitation) in psychiatry and neurology in 1897.

In 1892, Sachs published the first installment of an ambitious and informative atlas of the brain's white matter, with a focus on the anatomy of and connections between the occipital, temporal, and parietal lobes. Wernicke wrote the preface, expressing enthusiasm and admiration for the project. Further volumes were planned, but Sachs never completed them. The existing volume has recently been translated into English for the first time.

Among Sachs's contentions was that the superior fronto-occipital fasciculus (now called the Probst bundle) derived from callosal fibers. For this reason, it has been suggested that the Probst bundle be renamed the Sachs-Probst bundle. This suggestion has not been taken up, but Sach's name has been used for other structures and paths in the brain, such as the asciculus occipitalis transversus of Vialet and Sachs and the stratum sagittalis of Sachs. A structure that Sachs labeled the stratum profundum convexitatis in his atlas was the subject of controversy at the time, with leading neuropathologist Theodor Meynert denying its very existence; it is now known as the vertical occipital fasciculus.

Sachs also published on aphasia (1893, 1905) and traumatic neurosis (1909).

He died in Breslau in 1928.

== Personal life ==
Sachs married the daughter of a merchant family in Breslau; the couple's daughter was the poet Lessie Sachs.

In his private files, Sachs stated to the royal university to be of Jewish-Protestant faith.
