= Lateral occipital sulcus =

Groove in the brain's cerebral cortex

- Lateral surface of left cerebral hemisphere, viewed from the side. (Lat. occ. sulcus labeled at center right.)

Details

Identifiers
- Latin: Sulcus occipitalis lateralis
- NeuroNames: 143
- NeuroLex ID: birnlex_4017

In the occipital lobe, the lateral occipital sulcus, where present, divides the lateral, or middle occipital gyrus into a superior and an inferior part, which are then continuous in front with the parietal and temporal lobes. The anterior portion is often incomplete, but in some individuals it may encounter the superior temporal sulcus whilst the posterior portion originates from the middle of the curved lunate sulcus, or from a curved portion of the transverse occipital sulcus if absent.
