= VoF =

VoF, VOF or V.O.F. may refer to:

- Föreningen Vetenskap och Folkbildning, a Swedish skeptical organisation
- Volume of fluid method, a numerical technique for tracking and locating the fluid interface
- vertical occipital fasciculus, a part of the brain
- Vennootschap onder firma (V.O.F.), a type of general partnership in the Netherlands and Belgium
