= Brodmann area 19 =

Region of the brain's occipital cortex

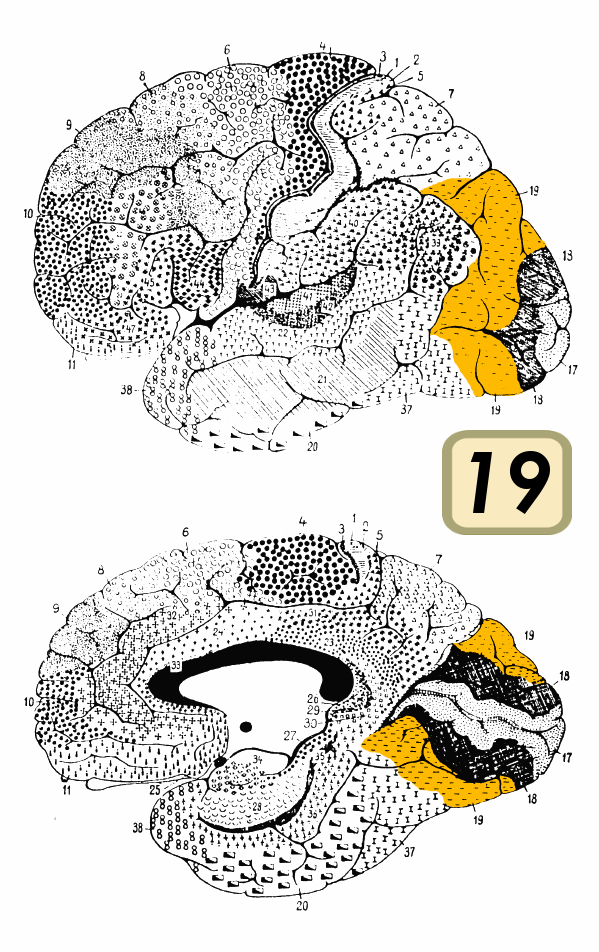
- Brodmann area 19 is shown in orange

Details

Identifiers
- Latin: area peristriata
- NeuroNames: 1028
- NeuroLex ID: birnlex_1750
- FMA: 68616

Brodmann area 19, or BA 19, is part of the occipital lobe cortex in the human brain. Along with area 18, it comprises the extrastriate (or peristriate) cortex. In humans with normal sight, extrastriate cortex is a visual association area, with feature-extracting, shape recognition, attentional, and multimodal integrating functions.

This area is also known as peristriate area 19, and it refers to a subdivision of the cytoarchitecturally defined occipital region of cerebral cortex. In the human it is located in parts of the lingual gyrus, the cuneus, the lateral occipital gyrus (H) and the superior occipital gyrus (H) of the occipital lobe where it is bounded approximately by the parieto-occipital sulcus. It is bounded on one side by the parastriate area 18, which it surrounds. It is bounded rostrally by the angular area 39 (H) and the occipitotemporal area 37 (H) (Brodmann-1909).

== In animals ==
Brodmann area 19-1909 is a subdivision of the cerebral cortex of the guenon defined on the basis of cytoarchitecture. It is cytoarchitecturally homologous to the peristriate area 19 of the human (Brodmann-1909). Distinctive features (Brodmann-1905): Compared to Brodmann area 18-1909, the pyramidal cells of sublayer 3b of the external pyramidal layer (III) are not as densely distributed, the layer is not as narrow, and its boundary with the internal granular layer (IV) is not as distinct; the cells in sublayer 3b are concentrated at its outer boundary leaving a narrow clear zone with no large pyramidal cells adjacent to layer IV; the granule cells of layer IV are less densely distributed and are intermixed with larger polymorphic cells so that, while the layer is still quite dark and prominent, it is somewhat widened and not as self-contained; the internal pyramidal layer (V) is characterized by large pyramidal ganglion cells, most in small groups, a pattern not seen in area 18; the cells in the multiform layer (VI) are clearly larger than in area 18; overall, area 19 is somewhat thicker and less densely populated than area 18.

== Function ==
Area 19 is a histologically delineated band anterolaterally abutting visual area 18. Single-cell electrophysiological recordings from area 19 in the cat suggest sensitivity to motion-delineated forms; recordings from primates have yielded varying results, indicating that this area may be a heterogeneous collection of visual areas, with multiple incomplete representations of the visual scene.

In humans, this band is reputed to contain regions of the visual areas designated V3, V4, V5 (also known as the middle temporal area, or MT), and V6 (also known as dorsomedial area) in the primate. Functional magnetic resonance imaging shows the existence of various retinotopic maps within area 19. In general, the diverse fields that comprise area 19 have reciprocal connections with areas 17 and 18, as well as posterior parietal and inferior temporal association areas.

Area 19 has been noted to receive inputs from the retina via the superior colliculus and pulvinar and may contribute to the phenomenon of blindsight. In patients blind from a young age, the area has been found to be activated by somatosensory stimuli.

Because of these findings, it is thought that area 19 is the differentiation point of the two visual streams of the 'what' and 'where' visual pathways. The dorsal region may contain motion-sensitive neurons, and ventral areas may be specialised for object recognition.

== See also ==
- Brodmann area
- List of regions in the human brain
