= Lessie Sachs =

German American poet and artist

- Born: 1897; Breslau, German Empire
- Died: 1942 (aged 44–45)
- Father: Heinrich Sachs

Lessie Sachs (1897–1942) was a German-born American poet and artist who was active during World War I and World War II.

== Biography ==
Lessie Sachs was born in 1897 in Breslau, then a city in the German Empire. She was the only child of neurologist Heinrich Sachs. Sachs attended schools in Breslau and Munich, where she studied arts and crafts.

Sachs primarily wrote lyrical love poems. Her earliest poems were published in the journal Simplicissimus. A number of German newspapers (e.g. the Vossische Zeitung) also published her work, and a few of her poems were set to music and broadcast on the radio.

In 1933, Sachs married Austrian composer and pianist Josef Wagner, with whom she had a daughter, Dorothée.

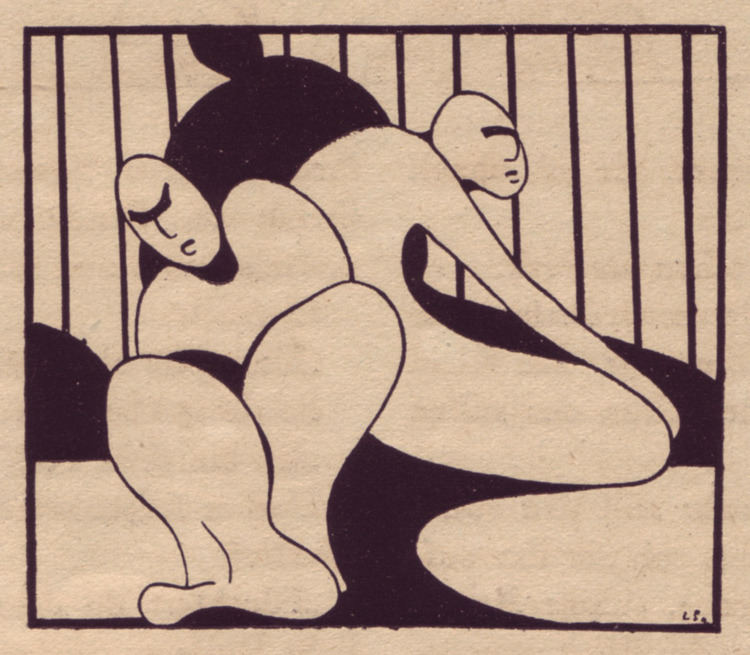
Drawing by Lessie Sachs published in Der Orchideengarten, 1919.

Sachs was Jewish, and in 1939 she and her family emigrated to the United States and settled in New York. Some of Sachs' work was then published in the New York-based German-Jewish newspaper Aufbau.

Although best known as a poet, Sachs was also an artist. At least one of her drawings was published in the rare German fantasy magazine Der Orchideengarten (The Orchid Garden), which lasted for only three years (1919–1921).

Sachs died in 1942. Two years later, her husband published a collection of her poems under the title Tag- und Nachtgedichte (Day and Night Poems), with a foreword by Heinrich Mann. A contemporary reviewer noted that Sachs's writing conveys "a distinct flavor of Munich and Berlin" through her unique blend of lyricism and wit salted with colloquialisms.

Her papers, including manuscripts and correspondence, are held by the Leo Baeck Institute.
