= Brodmann area 18 =

Part of the human brain

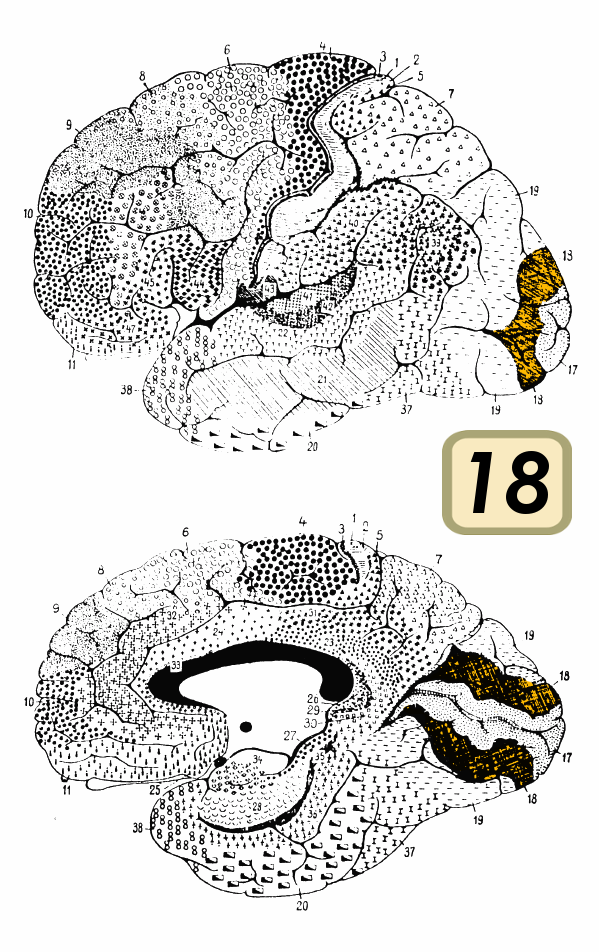
- Brodmann area 18

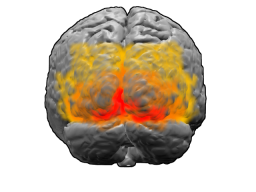
- Brodmann area 18 is shown in orange in this image which also shows areas 17 (red) and 19 (yellow)

Details

Identifiers
- Latin: area parastriata
- NeuroNames: 1027
- NeuroLex ID: birnlex_1749
- FMA: 68615

== Human ==
Brodmann area 18, or BA18, is part of the occipital cortex in the human brain. It accounts for the bulk of the volume of the occipital lobe. It is known as a "Visual Association Area" or V2 and is a first stage in processing or feature extraction of retinotopic images from V1.

This area is also known as parastriate area 18. It is a subdivision of the cytoarchitecturally defined occipital region of cerebral cortex. In the human it is located in parts of the cuneus, the lingual gyrus and the lateral occipital gyrus (H) of the occipital lobe. It is bounded on one side by the Brodmann area 17, from which it is distinguished by absence of a band of Gennari, and on the other by the peristriate area 19 (Brodmann-1909).

== Guenon ==
Brodmann area 18 is a subdivision of the cerebral cortex of the guenon defined on the basis of cytoarchitecture. It is topographically and cytoarchitecturally homologous to parastriate area 18 of the human (Brodmann-1909). Distinctive features (Brodmann-1905): a wide, dense internal granular cell layer (IV); a distinct sublayer 3b of closely packed large pyramidal cells positioned in the external pyramidal layer (III) directly above layer IV; an almost cell-free, narrow internal pyramidal layer (V) with no larger ganglion cells; a very narrow, dense multiform layer (VI) composed of small polymorphic cells that form a distinct boundary with the underlying subcortical white matter. Like area 17 of Brodmann-1905, area 18 is relatively thin, with the three deep layers thin relative to the three outer layers, and has distinct boundaries between layers, abundance of granule cells, narrow layer VI, and sharp boundary between cortex and subcortical white matter.

== See also ==
- Brodmann area
- List of regions in the human brain
