= Occipital gyri =

Three parallel gyri of the occipital lobe of the brain

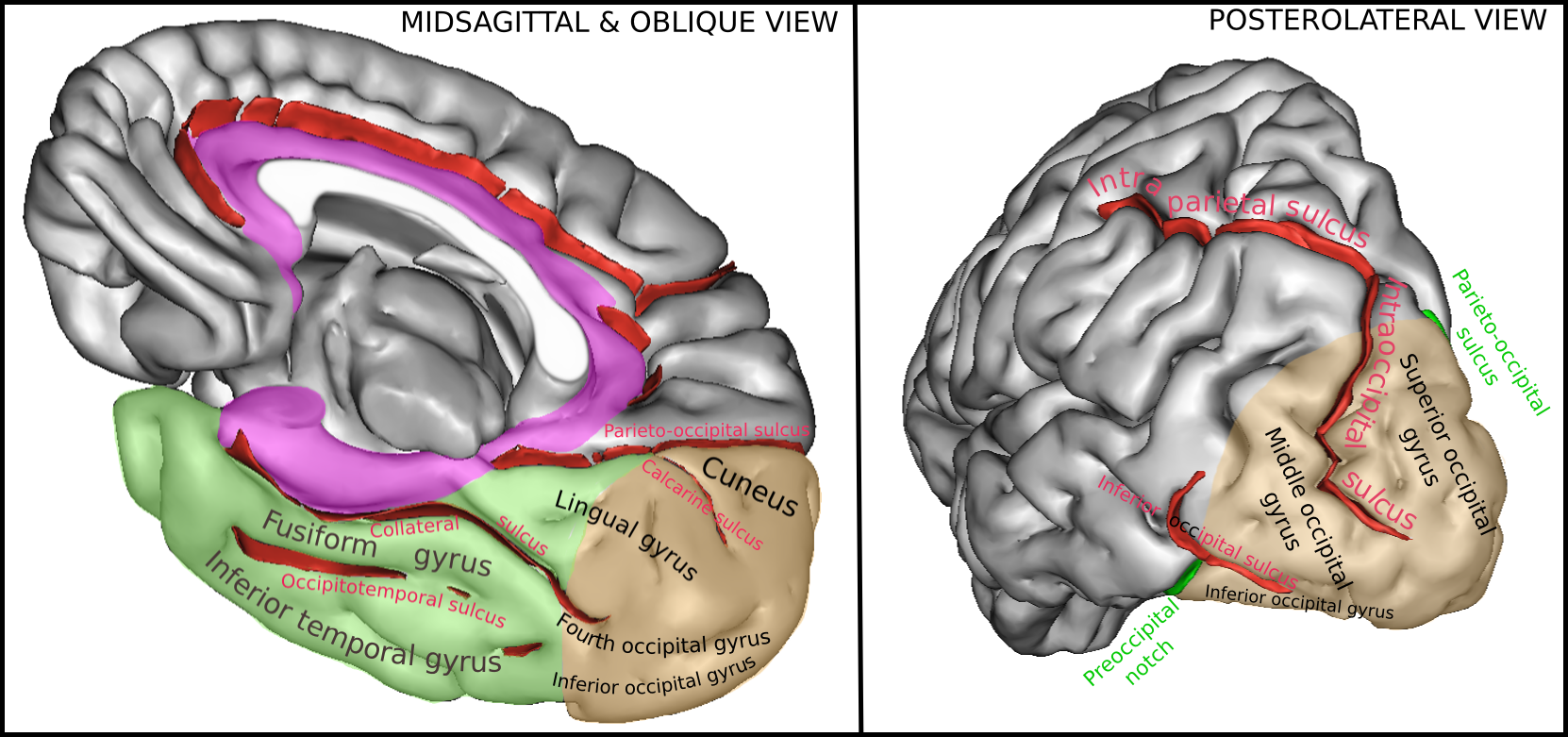
- Gyri of the occipital lobe shown on the right diagram

Details
- System: Visual System
- Location: Cerebrum

Identifiers
- Latin: gyri occipitalis

The occipital gyri (OcG) are three gyri in parallel, along the lateral portion of the occipital lobe, also referred to as a composite structure in the brain. The gyri are the superior occipital gyrus, the middle occipital gyrus, and the inferior occipital gyrus, and these are also known as the occipital face area. The superior and inferior occipital sulci separates the three occipital gyri.

The intraoccipital sulcus, also known as the superior occipital sulcus, stems from the intraparietal sulcus and continues until the sulcus reaches the transverse occipital sulcus, separating the superior occipital gyrus from the middle occipital gyrus. The transverse occipital sulcus comes down along the lateral occipital surface or the inferior occipital sulcus.

== Structural anatomy ==
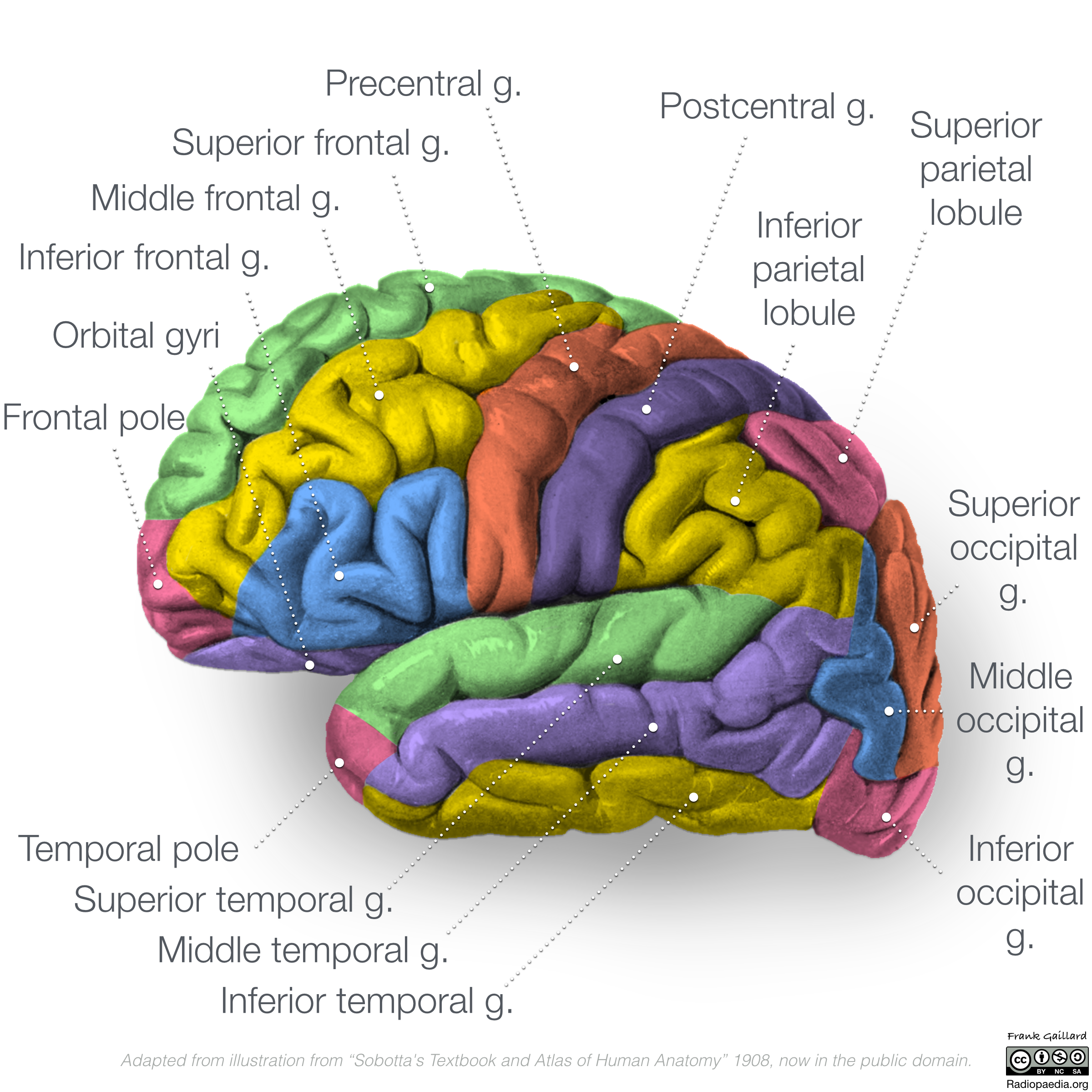
Diagram of gyri of brain viewed on lateral hemisphere. Occipital gyri shown lower right.

The border between the occipital lobe and the parietal and temporal lobes is characterized by different gyri: the superior occipital gyrus (also known as gyrus occipitalis superior), middle occipital gyrus (or gyrus occipitalis medius), inferior occipital gyrus (or gyrus occipitalis inferior), and descending occipital gyrus (gyrus occipitalis descendens).

== Function ==
The occipital complex is primarily responsible for object recognition, including the functional properties and our perception of said objects. The middle occipital gyrus (MOG) was observed in a study of the early blind, which showed that it was activated more during spatial than nonspatial tactile and auditory tasks. Early blind people have an occipital cortex that incorporates more senses than people with standard vision, but the MOG still keeps its functional role in processing space around a person.

The lingual gyrus (also known as medial occipitotemporal gyrus) has been studied and found to be included in processing overall shapes, rather than the individual components that make up a shape. This shows that the lingual gyrus is active during visual processing.

The inferior occipital gyrus has been found to be related to the visual function of processing faces. The IOG is connected to the amygdala via white matter connectivity. This allows the IOG to form a network for facial recognition with the amygdala.

== Development ==
The occipital lobe becomes distinct at 18 weeks gestation, but the gyri are not clear until many weeks later. During development, the occipital lobe develops a lingual gyrus at 27 weeks of gestation. Secondary gyri develop by 30 weeks, and tertiary gyri develop during 40 to 42 weeks of gestation. The superior and inferior occipital gyri develop at the same time, usually shown somewhere between week 24 and 27 in brain development. Due to the unclear distinction in early neuroscience research as to whether there are two or three occipital gyri, there is not any data on when the middle occipital gyrus starts its formation, but it is likely at the same time.
