= Orienting system =

The brain pathway that orients visual attention to a stimulus is referred to as the orienting system. There are two main types of visual orientations, covert (exogenous) which occurs when a salient environmental change causes a shift in attention and overt (endogenous) which occurs when the individual makes a conscious decision to orient attention to a stimuli During a covert orientation of attention, the individual does not physically move, and during an overt orientation of attention the individual's eyes and head physically move in the direction of the stimulus.

Information acquired through covert and overt visual orientations travels through the norepinephrine system, indirectly effecting the ventral visual pathway. The four specific brain regions involved in this process are the frontal eye field, the temporoparietal junction, the pulvinar, and the superior colliculus. The frontal eye field is involved in goal-driven eye movements and can inhibit stimulus driven eye movements. The temporoparietal junction appears to be involved location-cueing tasks, and individuals with lesions in this area have difficulty with attentional reorienting. The pulvinar is located posterior to the thalamus and its role in the orientating system is still being researched; however it is thought to be involved in covert orienting. Finally, the superior colliculus provides information about the location of the stimuli to which attention is directed.
