= Vertical occipital fasciculus =

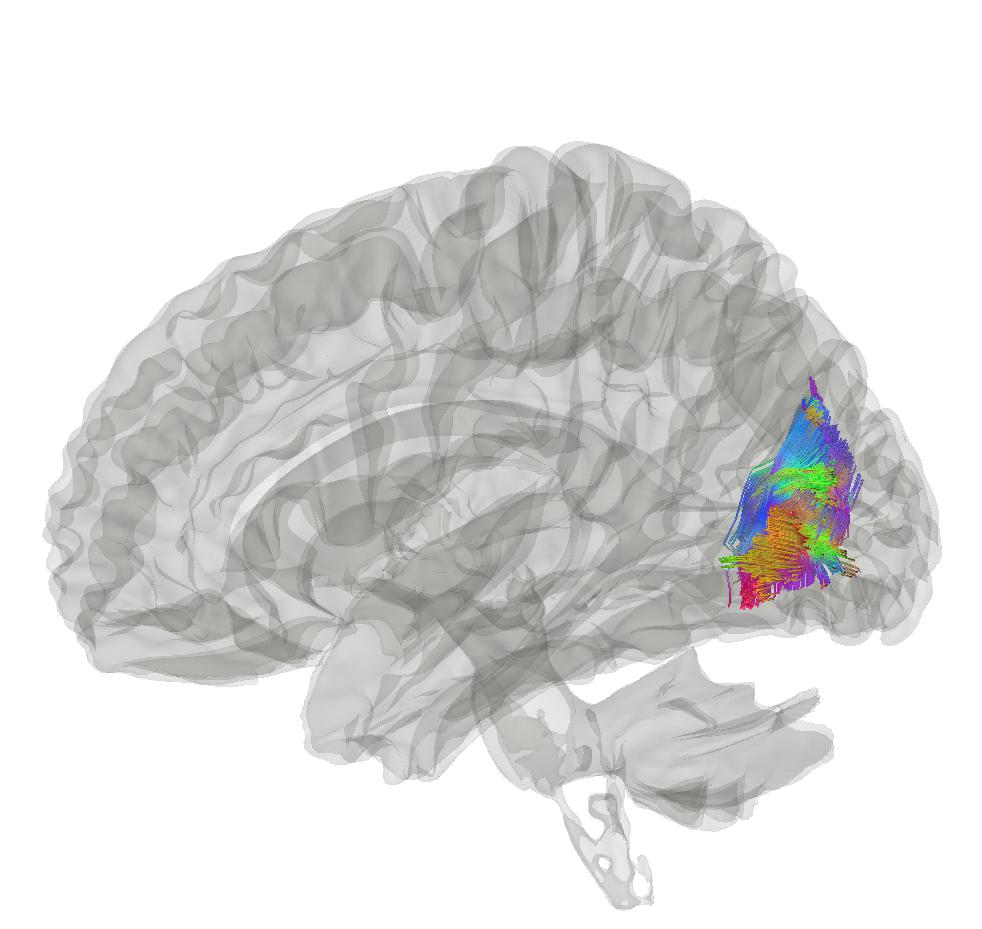

The vertical occipital fasciculus is a fascicle of white matter running vertically in the rear of the brain. It is found at least in primates. It "is the only major fiber bundle connecting dorsolateral and ventrolateral visual cortex."

== Early discovery ==
Originally depicted by Carl Wernicke, who called it the senkrechte Occipitalbündel (vertical occipital bundle), the region was practically lost to scientific knowledge during the twentieth century. Theodor Meynert had described the brain's other white matter tracts as being horizontally oriented, and did not accept Wernicke's finding. Heinrich Obersteiner named the area the "fasciculus occipitalis perpendicularis", and Heinrich Sachs named the area the "stratum profundum convexitatis". It appeared in a 1918 edition of Gray's Anatomy, but fell into obscurity. A diffusion tensor imaging (DTI) study in 2004 noted an area of short-range association fibers in the lateral occipital lobe, which they noted corresponded to the VoF.

== Structure and function ==
The vertical occipital fasciculus consists of long nerve fibers making connections between vision sub-regions in the rear of the brain. Research indicates that it is related to both vision and cognition, since injury to it can cause reading impairment.
