= Transverse occipital sulcus =

Structure in the brain

- Lateral surface of left cerebral hemisphere, viewed from the side. (Trans. occ. sulc. shown in orange.)

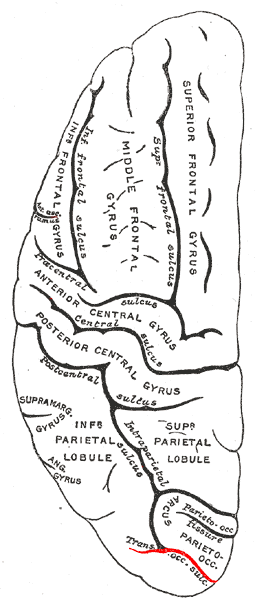
- Lateral surface of left cerebral hemisphere, viewed from above. (Trans. occ. sulc. shown in orange.)

Details

Identifiers
- Latin: sulcus occipitalis transversus
- TA98: A14.1.09.135
- TA2: 5484
- FMA: 83786

The transverse occipital sulcus is a sulcus in the occipital lobe.

The transverse occipital sulcus is continuous with the posterior end of the occipital ramus of the intraparietal sulcus, and runs across the upper part of the lobe, a short distance behind the parietooccipital fissure.
