= Lingual gyrus =

Gyrus of the occipital lobe of the brain

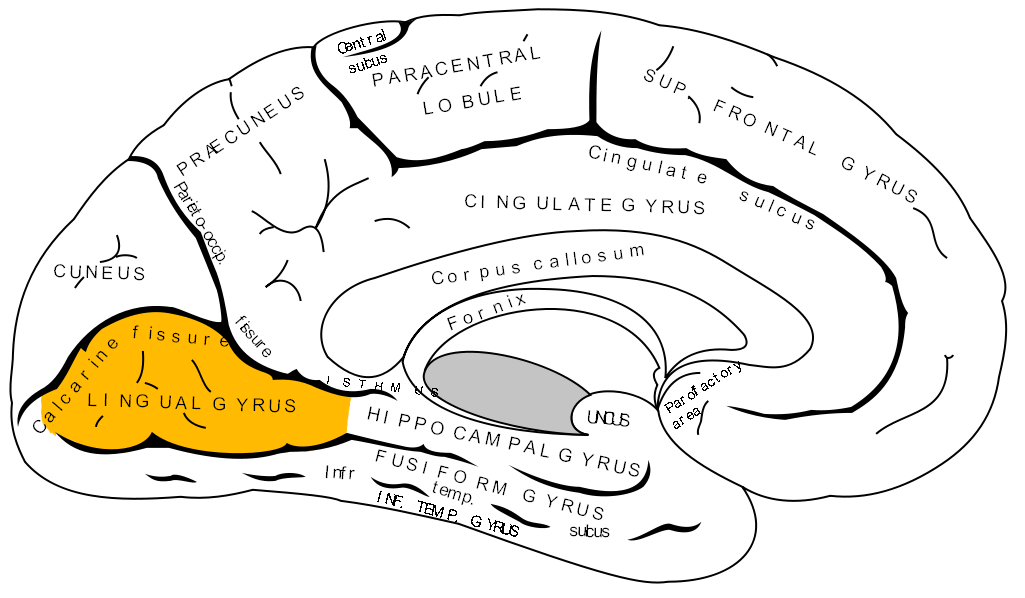
- Medial surface of left cerebral hemisphere. (Lingual gyrus visible at left.)

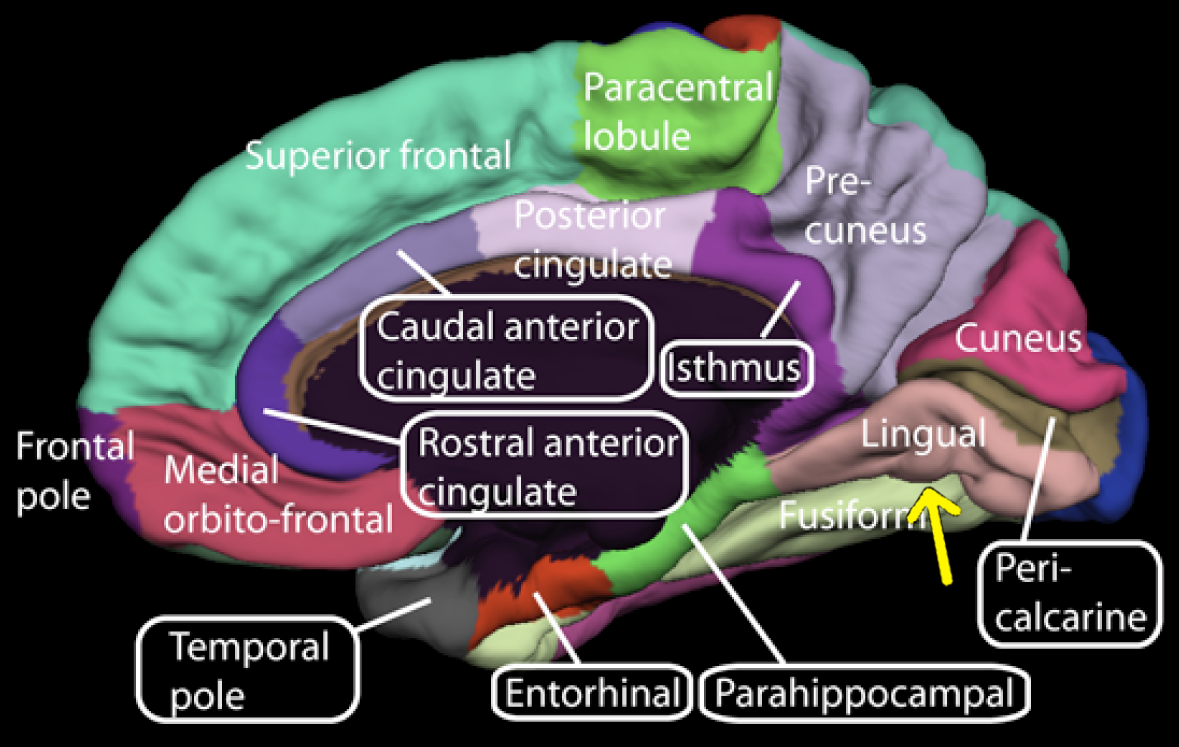
- Medial surface of right cerebral hemisphere. (Lingual gyrus visible at right.)

Details
- Part of: Occipital lobe
- Artery: Posterior cerebral

Identifiers
- Latin: gyrus lingualis
- NeuroNames: 158
- NeuroLex ID: birnlex_740
- TA98: A14.1.09.226
- TA2: 5487
- FMA: 61904

The lingual gyrus, also known as the medial occipitotemporal gyrus, is a brain structure that is linked to processing vision, especially related to letters. It is thought to also play a role in analysis of logical conditions (i.e., logical order of events) and encoding visual memories. It is named after its shape, which is somewhat similar to a tongue. Contrary to the name, the region has little to do with speech.

It is believed that a hypermetabolism of the lingual gyrus is associated with visual snow.

== Location ==
The lingual gyrus of the occipital lobe lies between the calcarine sulcus and the posterior part of the collateral sulcus; behind, it reaches the occipital pole; in front, it is continued on to the tentorial surface of the temporal lobe, and joins the parahippocampal gyrus.

== Function ==
=== Role in vision ===
This region is believed to play an important role in vision and dreaming. Visual memory dysfunction and visuo-limbic disconnection have been shown in cases where the lingual gyrus has been damaged (due to stroke or other traumatic brain injuries). Further, impaired visual memory is related to either damage to the region or disconnections between the gyrus and other brain structures. Hypermetabolism in the lingual gyrus has been associated with visual snow syndrome.

Lingual gyrus activation has been linked to encoding of complex images. Subjects were scanned using fMRI while looking at pictures. The images were emotionally neutral, with no people in close-up. Subjects were tasked with memorizing the images for recognition at a later date. Data from the fMRI showed activation in several structures, notably the lingual gyrus. Similar activation was recorded during the recollection several weeks later. It has also been shown that activation of the ventral occipitotemporal cortex, including the lingual gyrus, is related to the processing of visual information about parts of human faces. Furthermore, the left lingual gyrus activates during memorizing and maintaining images of human faces in working memory.

Activation of the lingual gyrus has been shown in selective visual attention studies. Subjects were tasked with memorizing symbols in certain visual fields while ignoring those in others. In some subjects, the lingual gyrus was activated. The hemispheric activation of the structure was dependent on which visual field the subject was focused on. Hemispheric-dependent gyrus activation has also been shown by isolating visual fields rather than by diverting focus.

=== Role in word processing ===
The lingual gyrus is a structure in the visual cortex that plays an important role in the identification and recognition of words. Studies have implicated the lingual gyrus as being involved in modulating visual stimuli (especially letters) but not whether or not the stimulus was a word. Further, the gyrus is related to the naming of stimuli. Furthermore, the gyrus has shown significant activation when moving from high to low contrast words as well as a correlation between word length and regional activation.

In addition to recognition of letters, the region has been linked to semantic processing. Subjects with aphasia were tested with a variety of aphasia tests while undergoing fMRI to determine which areas were affected. Repetition of stimuli led to modulation in the lingual gyrus in subjects not afflicted, while those with aphasia showed significantly less modulation.

Similarly, the region is activated by non-verbal, logic-based conditions. Subjects tasked with attributing intentions to characters in comic strips showed activation in the gyrus when comparing physical logic with and without characters. For example: if a subject was intended to determine what a character will do, the region will activate. Conversely, if the comic depicted a physical event without characters, the region was relatively dormant.

Additional studies have shown a relationship between memorization and activation in the gyrus. When subjects were tasked with pairing abstract nouns with either visual imagery or sentence generation, many areas in the occipital lobe – namely the lingual gyrus – showed task-selective memory effects. This effect was primarily linked to visual imagery, as there were no significant effects associated with sentence generation. This link between memory and the gyrus extends to retrieval fluency in children, as well. Studies have shown elevated signals in the lingual gyrus when subjects were tasked with retrieval of facts while problem solving. Control samples show the activation is not linked to the problem solving itself, rather the recollection. This suggests a potential link between the lingual gyrus and hippocampal regions in the brain. Furthermore, the gyrus is potentially linked to the amygdala. Gyrus activation was observed when subjects were tasked with verbalizing high-emotion words in contrast to neutral-emotion words. A second study linked the regions with high-emotion images. When subjects were shown emotional images, the amygdala and lingual gyrus both activated significantly more when compared to neutral-emotion images.

== Additional images ==
Position of lingual gyrus (shown in red).

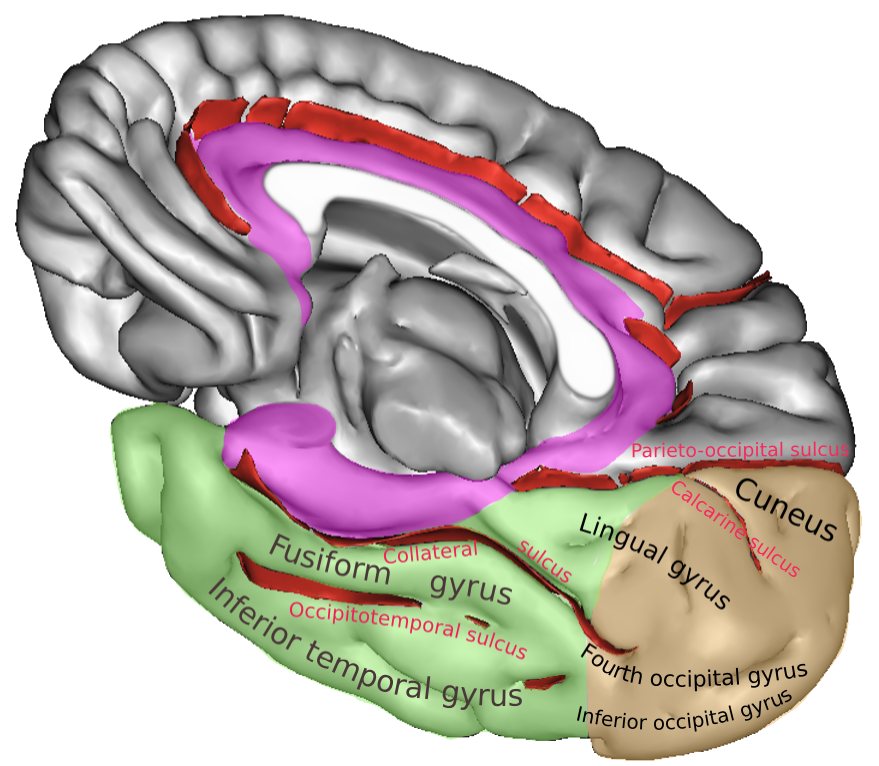
Gyri and sulci of occipital and temporal lobe.

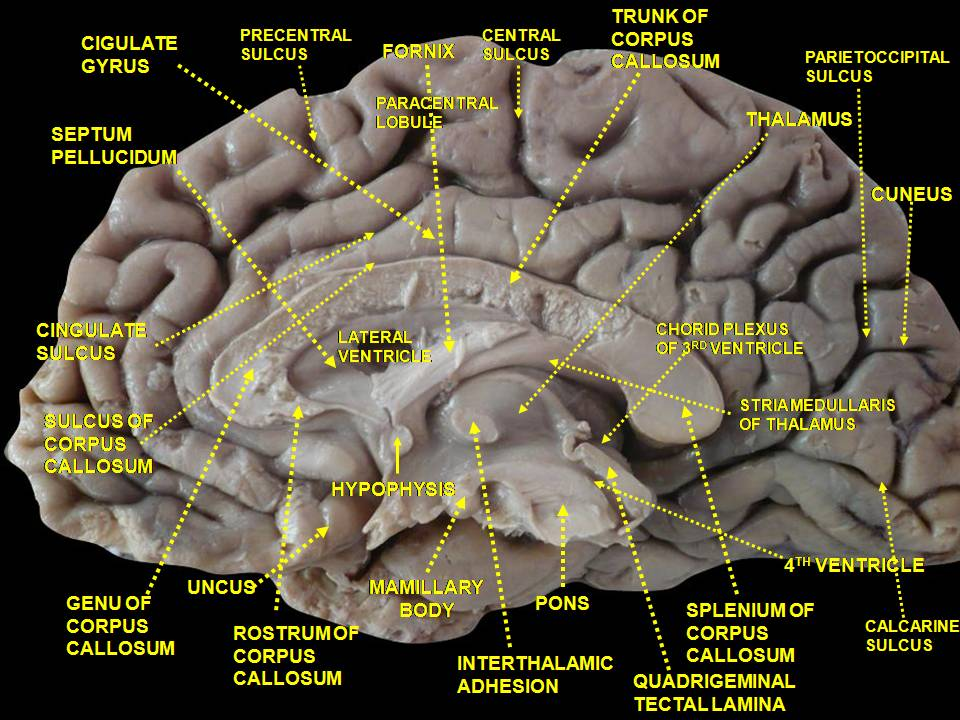
Medial surface of cerebral hemisphere. Medial view. Deep dissection.

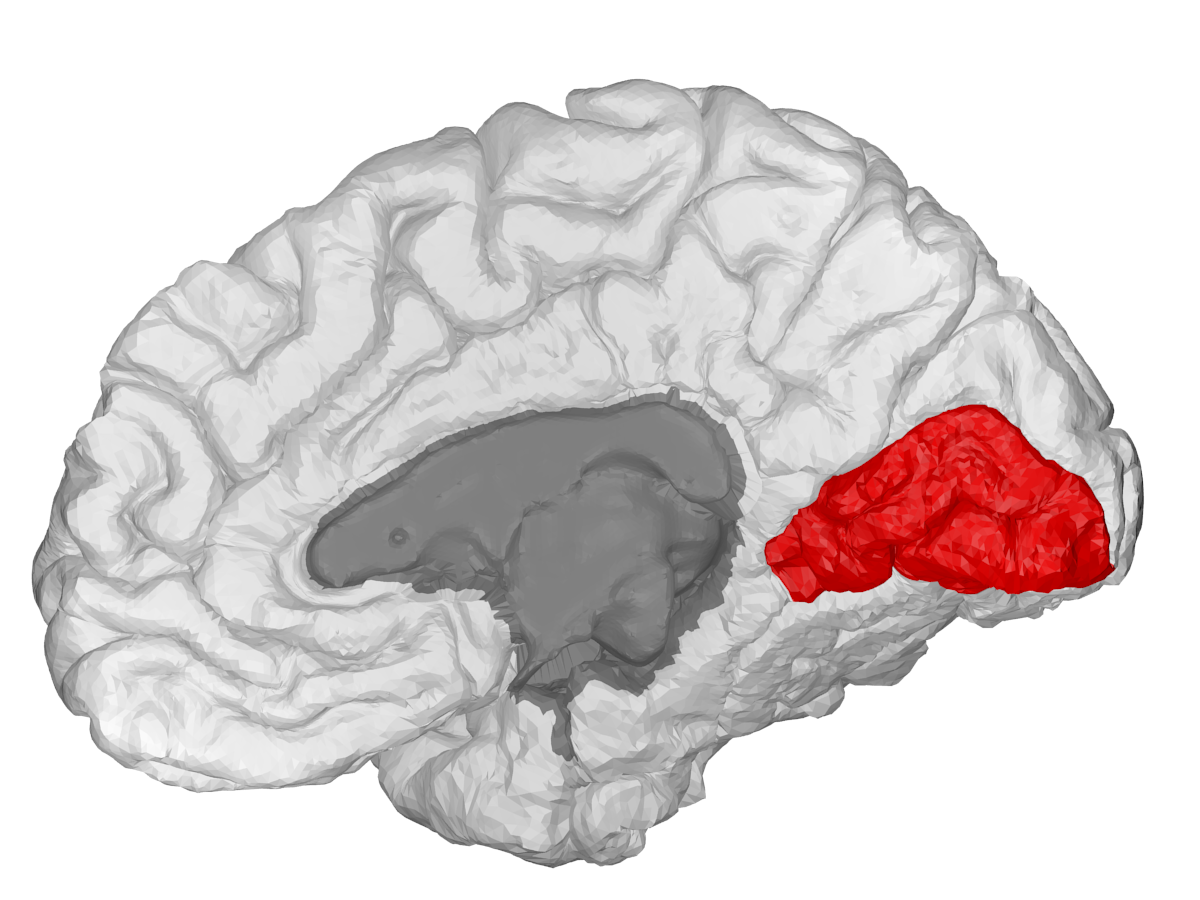
Inner lingual gyrus, shown in the right cerebral hemisphere.

Lingual gyrus highlighted in green on sagittal T1 MRI images

Lingual gyrus highlighted in green on coronal T1 MRI images

Lingual gyrus highlighted in green on transversal T1 MRI images

== See also ==
- Fusiform gyrus
