= Occipital lobe =

Part of the brain at the back of the head

- Lobes of the human brain (the occipital lobe is shown in red)

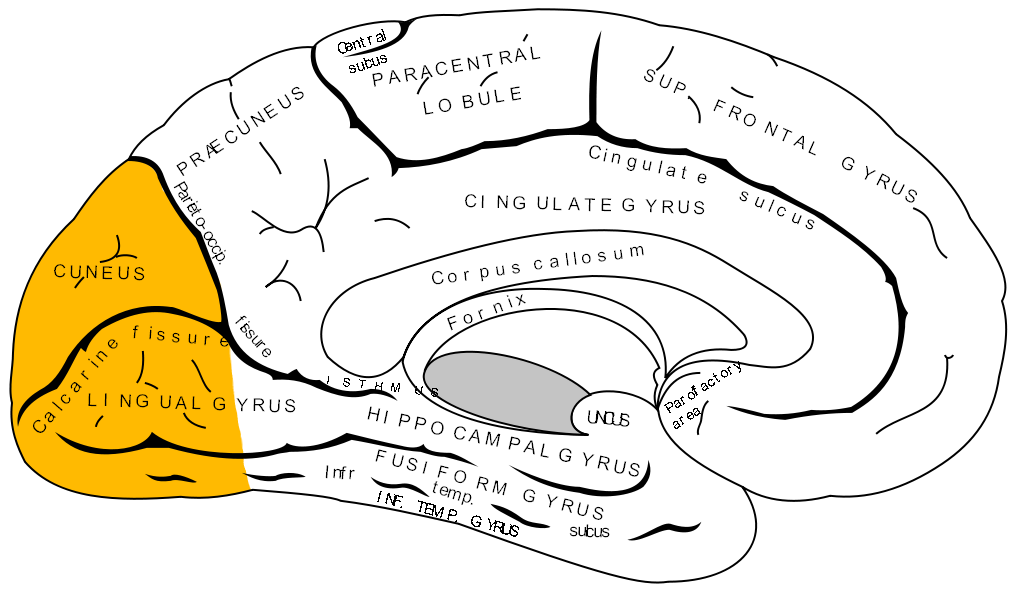
- Medial surface of left cerebral hemisphere. (Cuneus and lingual gyrus are at left.)

Details
- Part of: Cerebrum
- Artery: Posterior cerebral artery

Identifiers
- Latin: lobus occipitalis
- MeSH: D009778
- NeuroNames: 140
- NeuroLex ID: birnlex_1136
- TA98: A14.1.09.132
- TA2: 5480
- FMA: 67325

The occipital lobe is one of the four major lobes of the cerebral cortex in the brain of mammals. The name derives from its position at the back of the head, from the Latin ob, 'behind', and caput, 'head'.

The occipital lobe is the visual processing center of the mammalian brain, containing most of the anatomical region of the visual cortex. The primary visual cortex is Brodmann area 17, commonly called V1 (visual one). Human V1 is located on the medial side of the occipital lobe within the calcarine sulcus; the full extent of V1 often continues onto the occipital pole. V1 is often also called striate cortex because it can be identified by a large stripe of myelin, the stria of Gennari. Visually driven regions outside V1 are called extrastriate cortex. There are many extrastriate regions, and these are specialized for different visual tasks, such as visuospatial processing, color differentiation, and motion perception. Bilateral lesions of the occipital lobe can lead to cortical blindness (see Anton's syndrome).

== Structure ==
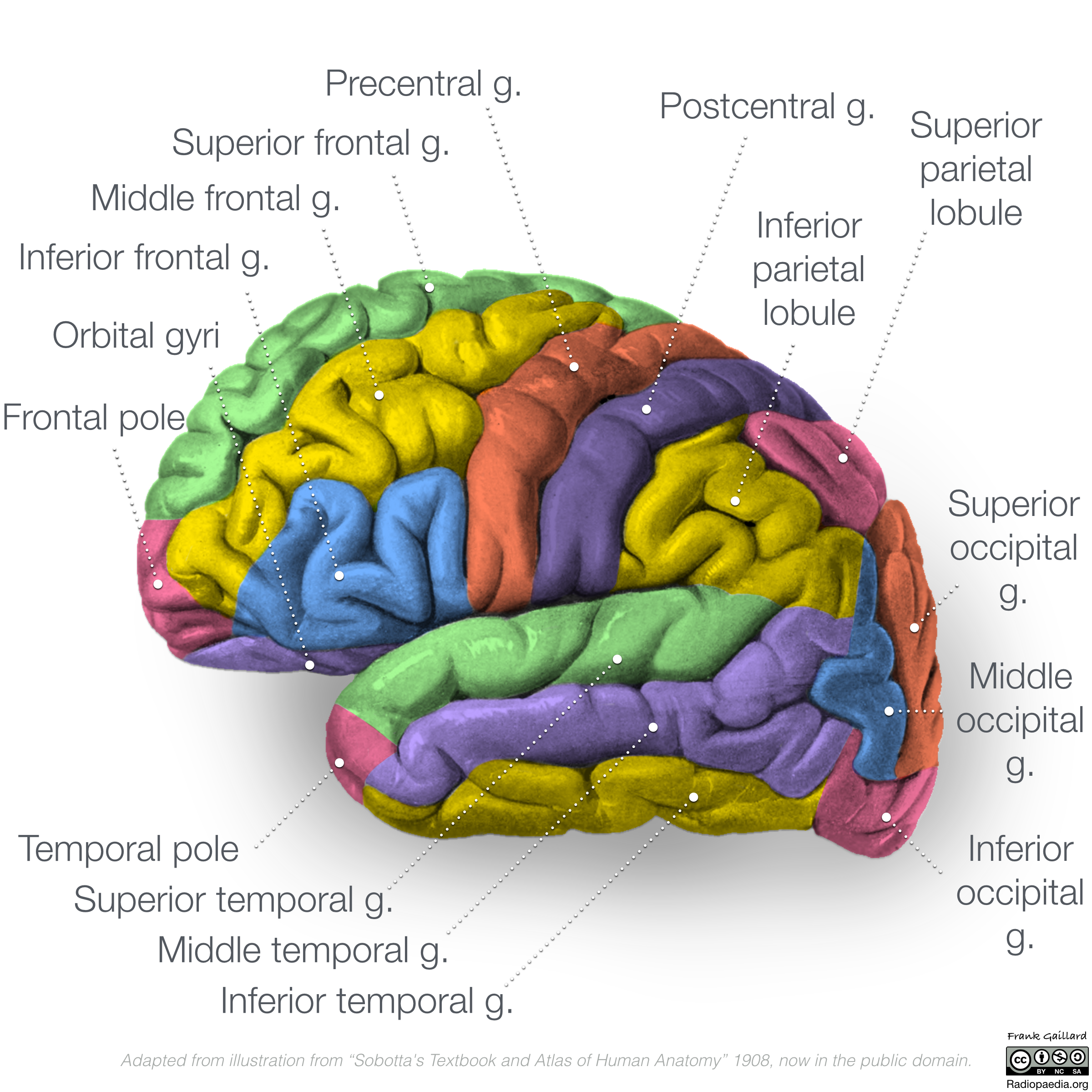
Diagram of gyri of brain viewed on lateral hemisphere. Occipital gyri shown lower right

Animation. Occipital lobe (red) of left cerebral hemisphere.

The two occipital lobes are the smallest of four paired lobes in the human brain. Located in the rearmost portion of the skull, the occipital lobes are part of the posterior cerebrum. The lobes of the brain are named from the overlying bone and the occipital bone overlies the occipital lobes.

The lobes rest on the tentorium cerebelli, a process of dura mater that separates the cerebrum from the cerebellum. They are structurally isolated in their respective cerebral hemispheres by the separation of the cerebral fissure. At the front edge of the occipital lobe are several occipital gyri, which are separated by lateral occipital sulcus.

The occipital aspects along the inside face of each hemisphere are divided by the calcarine sulcus. Above the medial, Y-shaped sulcus lies the cuneus, and the area below the sulcus is the lingual gyrus.

Damage to the primary visual areas of the occipital lobe can cause partial or complete blindness.

== Function ==
The occipital lobe is divided into several functional visual areas. Each visual area contains a full map of the visual world. Although there are no anatomical markers distinguishing these areas (except for the prominent striations in the striate cortex), physiologists have used electrode recordings to divide the cortex into different functional regions.

The first functional area is the primary visual cortex. It contains a low-level description of the local orientation, spatial-frequency and color properties within small receptive fields. Primary visual cortex projects to the occipital areas of the ventral stream (visual area V2 and visual area V4), and the occipital areas of the dorsal stream—visual area V3, visual area MT (V5), and the dorsomedial area (DM).

The ventral stream is known for processing the "what" in vision, while the dorsal stream handles the "where/how". This is because the ventral stream provides important information for the identification of stimuli that are stored in memory. With this information in memory, the dorsal stream is able to focus on motor actions in response to the outside stimuli.

Although numerous studies have shown that the two systems are independent and structured separately from another, there is also evidence that both are essential for successful perception, especially as the stimuli take on more complex forms. For example, a case study using fMRI was done on shape and location. The first procedure consisted of location tasks. The second procedure was in a lit-room where participants were shown stimuli on a screen for 600 ms. They found that the two pathways play a role in shape perception even though location processing continues to lie within the dorsal stream.

The dorsomedial (DM) is not as thoroughly studied. However, there is some evidence that suggests that this stream interacts with other visual areas. A case study on monkeys revealed that information from V1 and V2 areas make up half the inputs in the DM. The remaining inputs are from multiple sources that have to do with any sort of visual processing

Retinal sensors convey stimuli through the optic tracts to the lateral geniculate bodies, where optic radiations continue to the visual cortex. Each visual cortex receives raw sensory information from the outside half of the retina on the same side of the head and from the inside half of the retina on the other side of the head. The cuneus (Brodmann's area 17) receives visual information from the contralateral superior retina representing the inferior visual field. The lingula receives information from the contralateral inferior retina representing the superior visual field. The retinal inputs pass through a "way station" in the lateral geniculate nucleus of the thalamus before projecting to the cortex. Cells on the posterior aspect of the occipital lobes' gray matter are arranged as a spatial map of the retinal field. Functional neuroimaging reveals similar patterns of response in cortical tissue of the lobes when the retinal fields are exposed to a strong pattern.

== Clinical significance ==
If one occipital lobe is damaged, the result can be homonymous hemianopsia vision loss from similarly positioned "field cuts" in each eye. Occipital lesions can cause visual hallucinations. Lesions in the parietal-temporal-occipital association area are associated with color agnosia, movement agnosia, and agraphia. Lesions near the left occipital lobe can result in pure alexia (alexia without agraphia). Damage to the primary visual cortex, which is located on the surface of the posterior occipital lobe, can cause blindness due to the holes in the visual map on the surface of the visual cortex that resulted from the lesions.

=== Epilepsy ===
Recent studies have shown that specific neurological findings have affected idiopathic occipital lobe epilepsies. Occipital lobe seizures are triggered by a flash, or a visual image that contains multiple colors. These are called flicker stimulation (usually through TV); these seizures are referred to as photo-sensitivity seizures. Patients having experienced occipital seizures described their seizures as featuring bright colors, and severely blurring their vision (vomiting was also apparent in some patients). Occipital seizures are triggered mainly during the day, through television, video games or any flicker stimulatory system. Occipital seizures originate from an epileptic focus confined within the occipital lobes. They may be spontaneous or triggered by external visual stimuli. Occipital lobe epilepsies are etiologically idiopathic, symptomatic, or cryptogenic. Symptomatic occipital seizures can start at any age, as well as any stage after or during the course of the underlying causative disorder. Idiopathic occipital epilepsy usually starts in childhood. Occipital epilepsies account for approximately 5% to 10% of all epilepsies.

== Additional images ==
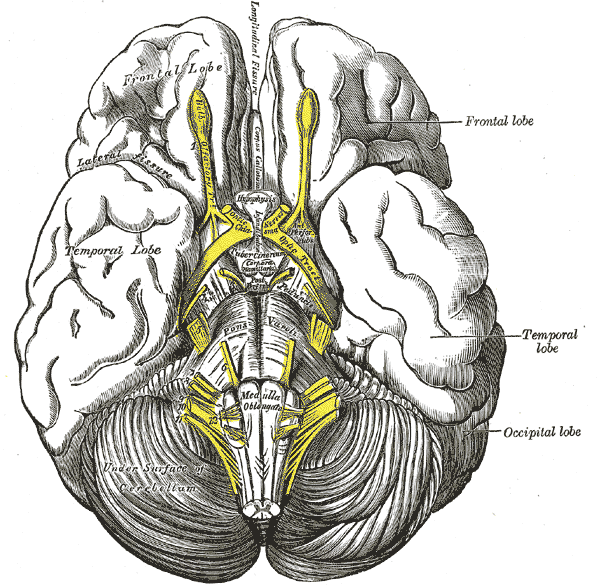
Base of brain.

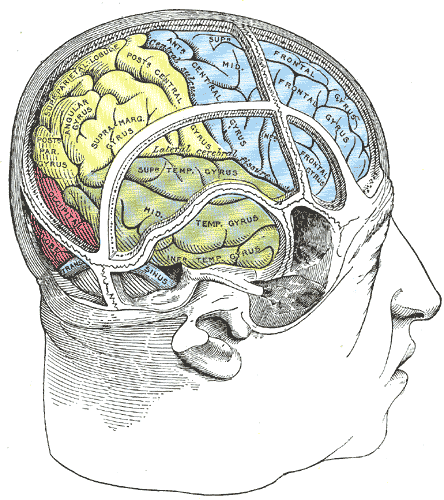
Drawing to illustrate the relations of the brain to the skull.

Occipital lobe in blue

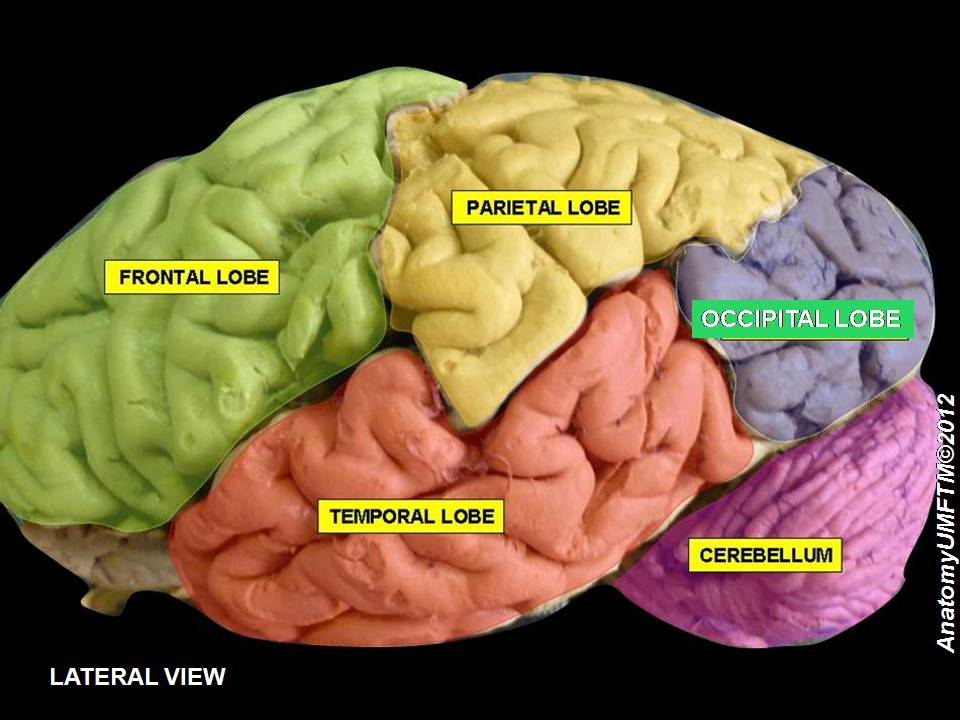
Occipital lobe

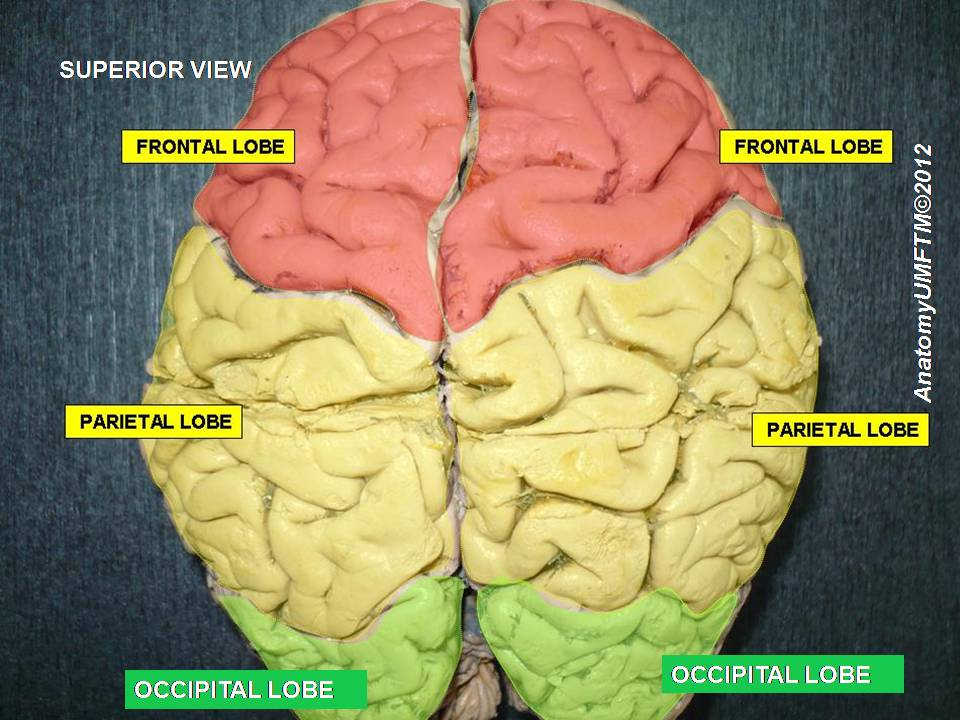
Occipital lobe

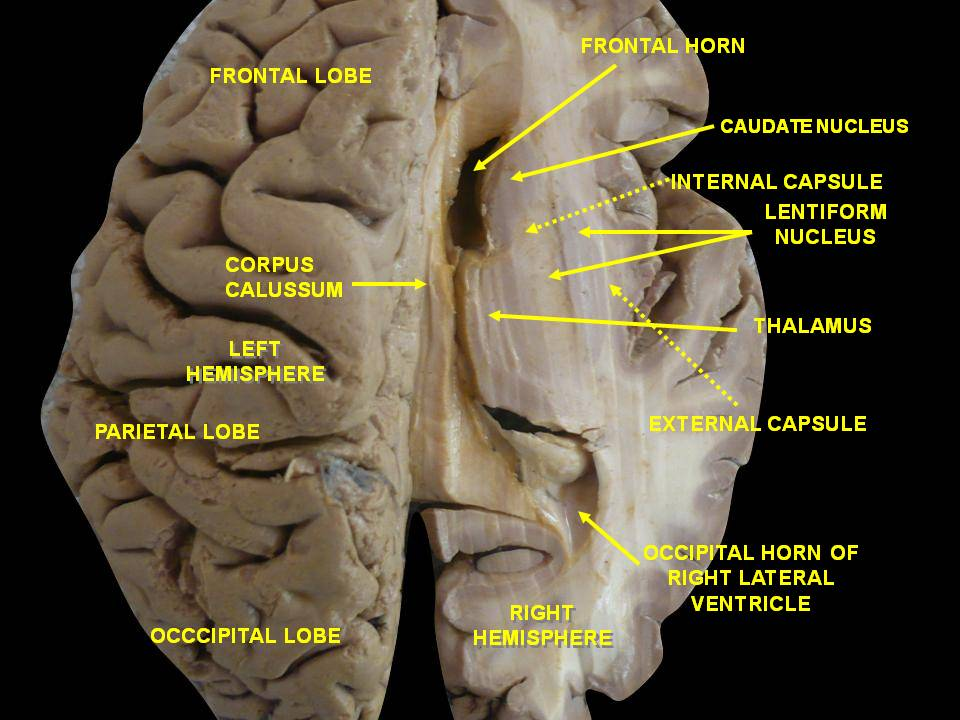
Ventricles of brain and basal ganglia. Superior view. Horizontal section. Deep dissection

== See also ==
- Alpha wave
- Lobes of the brain
- List of regions in the human brain
- Lunate sulcus
- Visual evoked potential
- Vertical occipital fasciculus
- Visual snow syndrome
