= Subparietal sulcus =

Fold in the brain which separates the precuneus and cingulate gyrus

- Medial surface of human cerebral hemisphere. Subparietal sulcus shown in red.

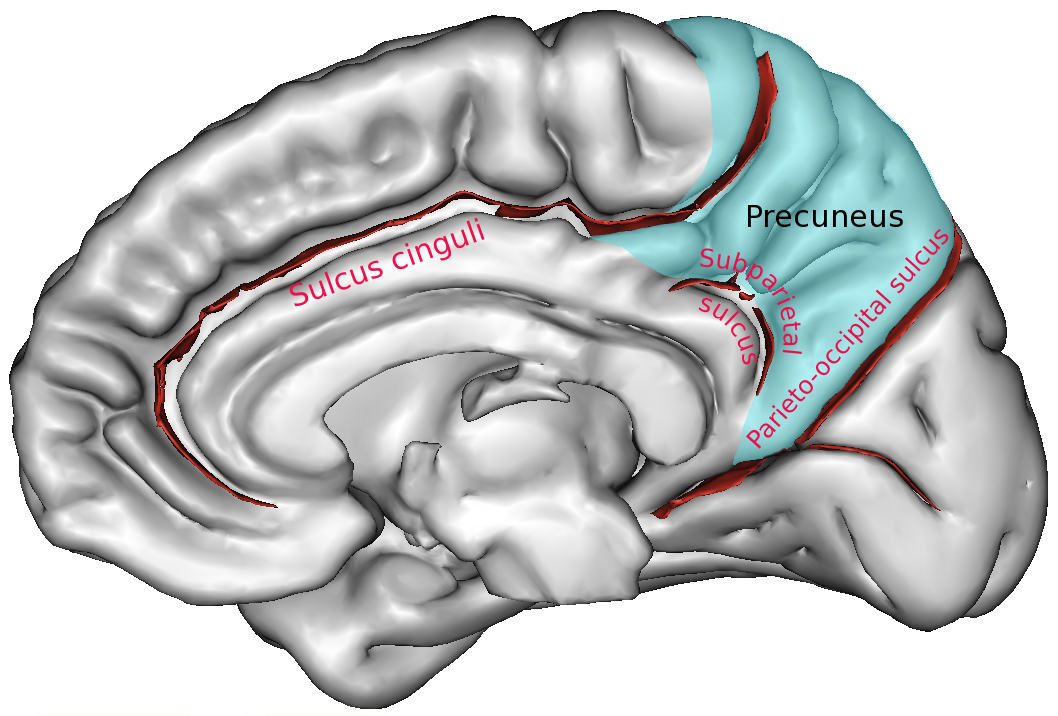
- Medial surface of human cerebral hemisphere. Subparietal sulcus shown in center right.

Details

Identifiers
- Latin: sulcus subparietalis
- TA98: A14.1.09.205
- TA2: 5441
- FMA: 83777

In neuroanatomy, the subparietal sulcus (Sulcus subparietalis) or suprasplenial sulcus is a sulcus, or crevice, on the medial surface of each cerebral hemisphere, above the splenium of the corpus callosum. It separates the precuneus from the posterior part of the cingulate gyrus. It is the posterior continuation of the cingulate sulcus. The cingulate sulcus actually "terminates" as the marginal sulcus of the cingulate sulcus (margin of cingulate gyrus). It extends posteriorly toward the calcarine sulcus.

The precuneus is bordered anteriorly by the marginal branch of the cingulate sulcus (margin of cingulate sulcus), posteriorly by the parieto-occipital sulcus, and inferiorly by the subparietal sulcus.

== Additional images ==
Subparietal sulcus (shown in red).

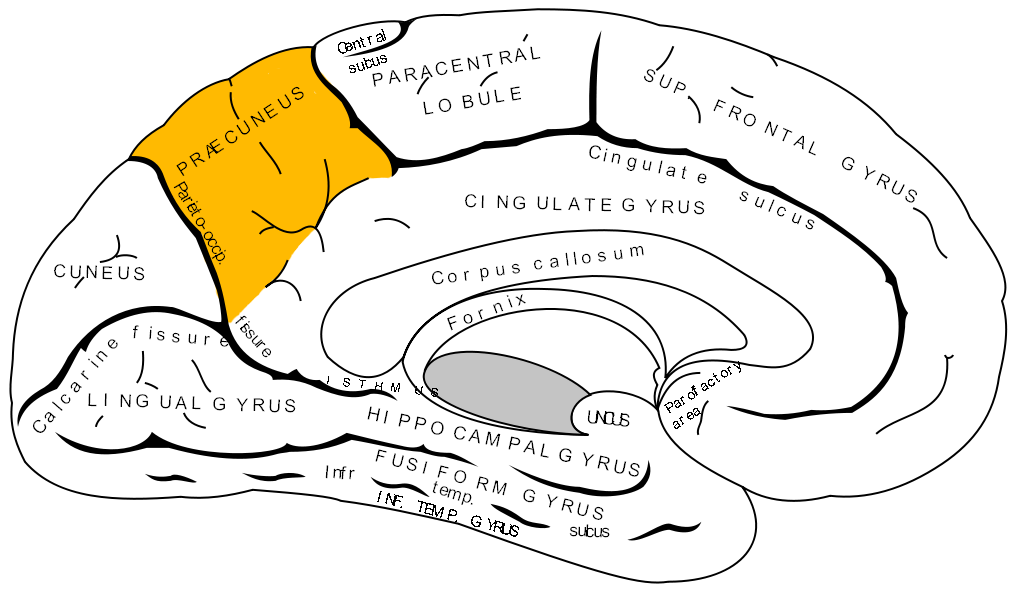
Precuneus.

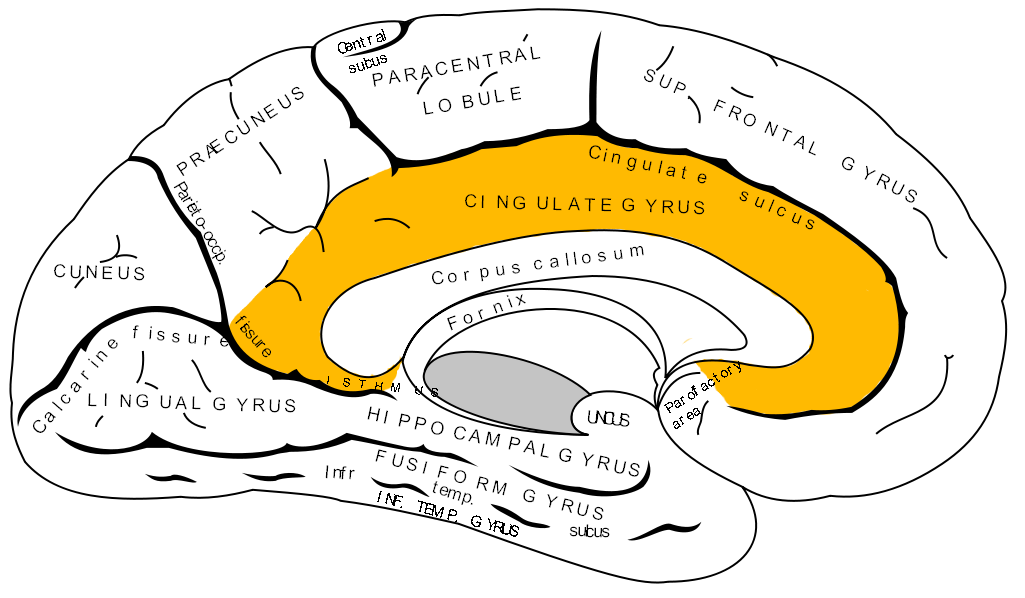
Cingulate gyrus.

Cingulate sulcus.

Marginal branch of cingulate sulcus.
