= Precuneus =

Region of the parietal lobe of the brain

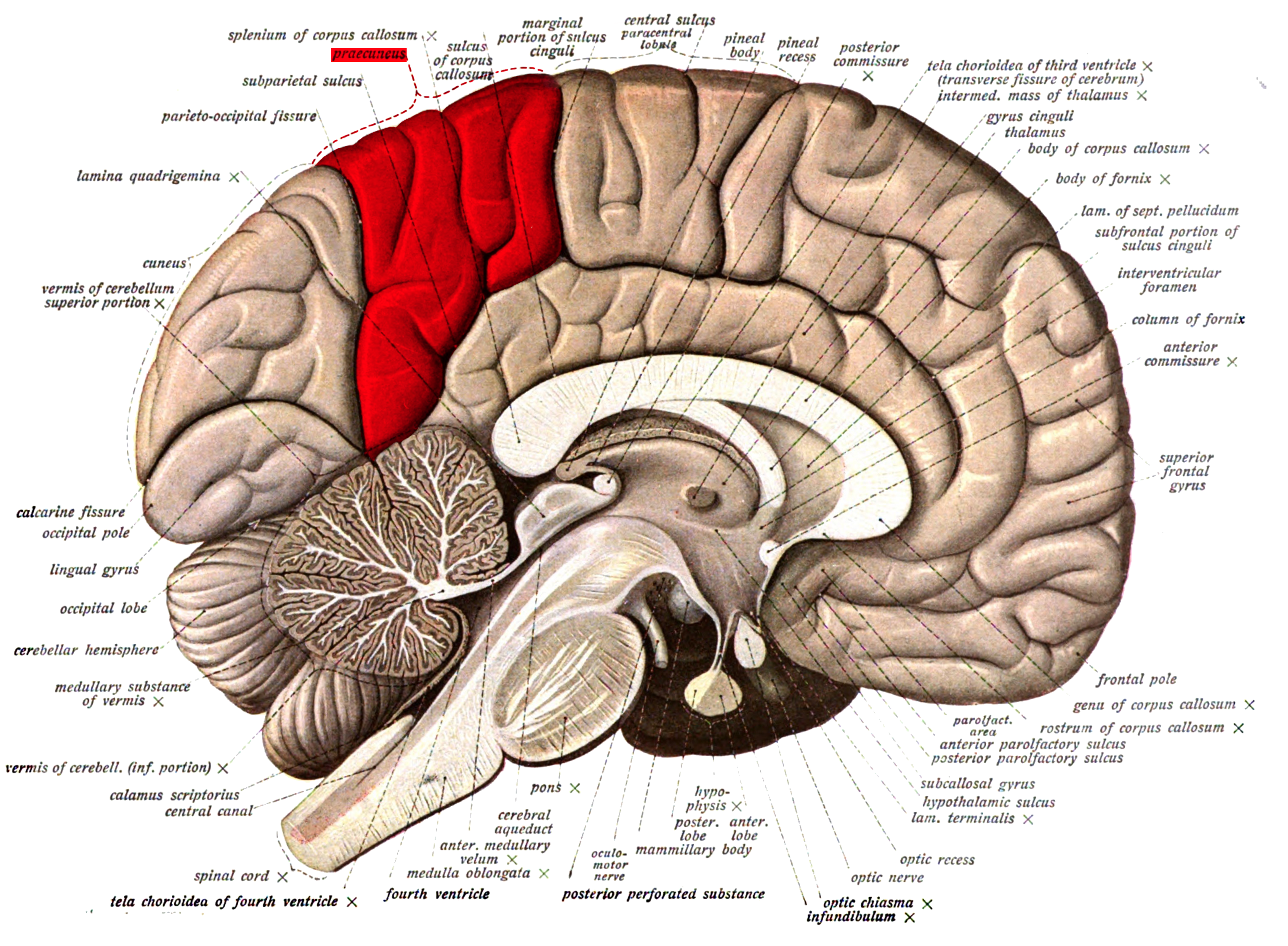
- Medial surface of left cerebral hemisphere. (Precuneus visible at top left.) (Anterior to the right.)

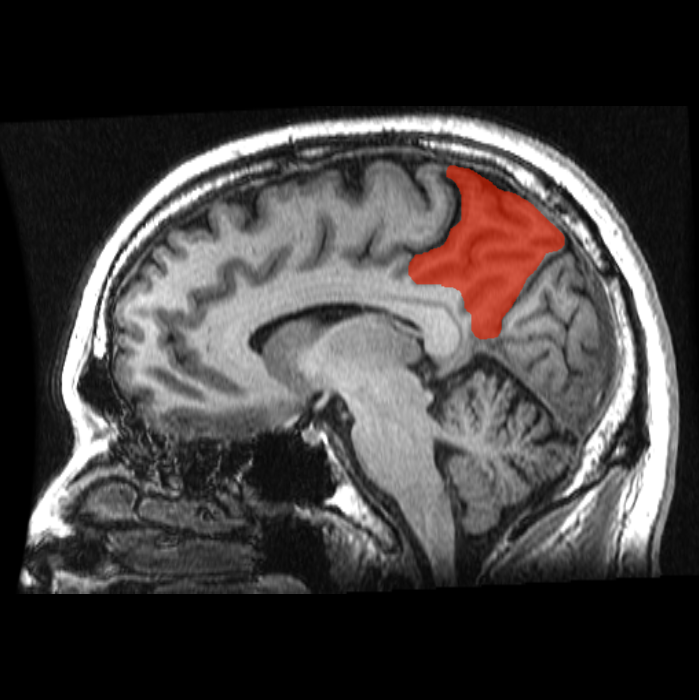
- Sagittal MRI slice with the precuneus shown in red. (Anterior to the left.)

Details

Identifiers
- Latin: praecuneus
- NeuroNames: 110
- NeuroLex ID: birnlex_1446
- TA98: A14.1.09.223
- TA2: 5479
- FMA: 61900

In neuroanatomy, the precuneus is the portion of the superior parietal lobule on the medial surface of each brain hemisphere. It is located in front of the cuneus (the upper portion of the occipital lobe). The precuneus is bounded in front by the marginal branch of the cingulate sulcus, at the rear by the parieto-occipital sulcus, and underneath by the subparietal sulcus. It is involved with episodic memory, visuospatial processing, reflections upon self, and aspects of consciousness.

The location of the precuneus makes it difficult to study. Furthermore, it is rarely subject to isolated injury due to strokes, or trauma such as gunshot wounds. This has resulted in it being "one of the less accurately mapped areas of the whole cortical surface". While originally described as homogeneous by Korbinian Brodmann, it is now appreciated to contain three subdivisions.

It is also known after Achille-Louis Foville as the quadrate lobule of Foville. The Latin form of praecuneus was first used in 1868 and the English precuneus in 1879.

== Structure ==
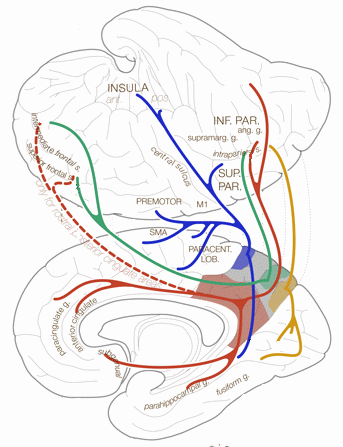
Subdivisions of precuneus and posterior cingulate in the human based upon resting state functional connectivity. Blue: Sensorimotor Anterior Region and its connections Green: Cognitive/Associative Central Region Yellow: Visual Posterior Region (The red color shows the posterior cingulate and its connections.)

The precuneus is located on the inside between the two cerebral hemispheres in the rear region between the somatosensory cortex and forward of the cuneus (which contains the visual cortex). It is above the posterior cingulate. Following Korbinian Brodmann it has traditionally been considered a homogeneous structure and with limited distinction between it and the neighboring posterior cingulate area. Brodmann mapped it as the medial continuation of lateral parietal area 7.

Axon tracing research on macaque monkeys has established that it consists of three subdivisions which now have been confirmed by fMRI upon resting-state functional connectivity to also exist in humans (parallel fMRI research has also been done upon monkeys).

=== Subdivisions ===
Sensorimotor Anterior Region

This occurs around the margin of the cingulate sulcus ( blue in figure) and is connected with sensorimotor areas of the cerebral cortex such as the paracentral lobule, supplementary motor area, premotor cortex, somatosensory area (Brodmann area 2), parietal operculum and insula. fMRI Research upon humans finds a connection with the caudalmost part of parahippocampus and superior temporal gyrus. No connections with the inferior parietal lobule, prefrontal cortex nor primary motor cortex.

Cognitive/Associative Central Region

This occurs around the precuneal sulcus ( green in figure) and is connected with the inferior parietal lobule particularly the angular gyrus and prefrontal areas 10, 46 and 8. No connections exist with premotor, motor, or somatosensory areas. The areas with which it links are involved in executive functions, working memory and motor planning.

Visual Posterior Region

This occurs along the parieto-occipital fissure ( yellow in figure). This connects with visual areas in the cuneus and primary visual cortex.

=== Subcortical connections ===
Below the cerebral cortex, the precuneus is connected with the dorsalmost nuclei of the thalamus, including the ventral lateral nucleus, the central and anterior nuclei of the intralaminar nuclear group, and the lateral pulvinar. Other connections include the claustrum, the dorsolateral caudate nucleus, putamen, and the zona incerta. It also has links with the brainstem areas such as the pretectal area, the superior colliculus, the nucleus reticularis tegmenti pontis, and the basis pontis.

== Function ==
The mental imagery concerning the self has been located in the forward part of the precuneus with posterior areas being involved with episodic memory. Another area has been linked to visuospatial imagery. (It is not though clear how these—and the functions noted below—link with the above three subdivisions.)

The precuneus plays a role in itch sensations (there are many different types of itch) and their brain processing "'We can't [yet] pinpoint what the precuneus does in itch, but it's uniquely activated with itch and not pain.'"

=== Self ===
Functional imaging has linked the precuneus to the processes involved in self-consciousness, such as reflective self-awareness, that involve rating one's own personality traits compared to those judged of other people.

Electrical stimulation of the anterior portion can induce an out of body experience.

=== Memory ===
The precuneus is involved in memory tasks, such as when people look at images and try to respond based on what they have remembered in regard to verbal questions about their spatial details. It is involved with the left prefrontal cortex in the recall of episodic memories including past episodes related to the self. The precuneus is also involved in source memory (in which the "source" circumstances of a memory are recalled) with the left inferior prefrontal cortex: here its role is postulated to be providing rich episodic contextual associations used by the prefrontal cortex to select the correct past memory. In the recollection of memories, it has been postulated that the precuneus discerns whether contextual information exists that can be useful for involving the aid of the hippocampus. Alternatively it has a different involvement when judging the familiarity as it decides whether the processing of perceptual features would be more useful. In this way the precuneus gets involved in diverse processes such as attention, episodic memory retrieval, working memory and conscious perception.

=== Visuospatial ===
The precuneus has been suggested to be involved in directing attention in space both when an individual makes movements and when imaging or preparing them. It is involved in motor imagery and shifting attention between motor targets. It is also involved in motor coordination that requires shifting attention to different spatial locations. It is also together with the dorsal premotor cortex involved in visuospatial mental operations (such as in a modified form of the game of Amidakuji). It is suggested that while the premotor area engages in the mental operation, the precuneus aids monitoring the success of that operation in terms of internally represented visual images.

The precuneus' role in mental imagery has been suggested to extend to that of modeling other people's views. It is activated when a person takes a third-person versus first-person visual point of view. Together with the superior frontal gyrus and orbitofrontal cortex, the precuneus is activated when people make judgments that require understanding whether to act out of empathy and forgiveness.

=== Executive functions ===
Precuneus is thought to be related to response inhibition.

=== Consciousness ===
It has been suggested that together with the posterior cingulate, the precuneus is "pivotal for conscious information processing". The evidence for this link with consciousness comes from the effects of its disruption in epilepsy, brain lesions and vegetative state. Also, cerebral glucose metabolism is at its highest in these two areas during wakefulness but is most reduced in them during anesthesia. In addition, it is one of the areas of the brain most deactivated during slow-wave sleep and rapid eye movement sleep.

Together with the prefrontal cortex, the precuneus, is more activated upon the learning of words briefly flashed when they are supraliminal (and so enter consciousness) than subliminal (and so do not enter consciousness).

=== Default network ===
It has been suggested to be the 'core node' or 'hub' of the default mode network that is activated during "resting consciousness" in which people do not engage intentionally in sensory or motor activity. This involvement in the default network is suggested to underlie its role in self-consciousness. However its involvement in the default network has been questioned. Though one of the authors raising these doubts noted "our findings in this regard should be treated as preliminary." A later study in 2012 showed that only ventral precuneus is involved in the default network.

=== Parietal prefrontal central hub ===
Olaf Sporns and Ed Bullmore have proposed that its functions link to its role as a central and well connected "small-world network" hub between parietal and prefrontal regions.

These clusters or modules are interlinked by specialized hub regions, ensuring that overall path lengths across the network are short. Most studies identified [such] hubs among parietal and prefrontal regions, providing a potential explanation for their well-documented activation by many cognitive functions. Particularly notable is the prominent structural role of the precuneus, a region that is homologous to the highly connected posteromedial cortex in the macaque. The precuneus is involved in self-referential processing, imagery and memory, and its deactivation is associated with anaesthetic-induced loss of consciousness. An intriguing hypothesis suggests that these functional aspects can be explained on the basis of its high centrality in the cortical network.

== Correlation of grey matter volume and subjective happiness score ==
A positive relationship has been found between the volume of grey matter in the right precuneus and the subject's subjective happiness score.

== Impact of mindfulness ==
A 6-week mindfulness based intervention was found to correlate with a significant grey matter increase within the precuneus.

== Other animals ==
The precuneus seems to be a recently expanded part of the brain, as in less developed primates such as New World monkeys "the superior parietal and precuneate regions are poorly developed". It has been noted that "the precuneus is more highly developed (i.e. comprises a larger portion of the brain volume) in human beings than in non-human primates or other animals, has the most complex columnar cortical organization and is among the last regions to myelinate".

== Additional images ==
Precuneus of left cerebral hemisphere (shown in red).

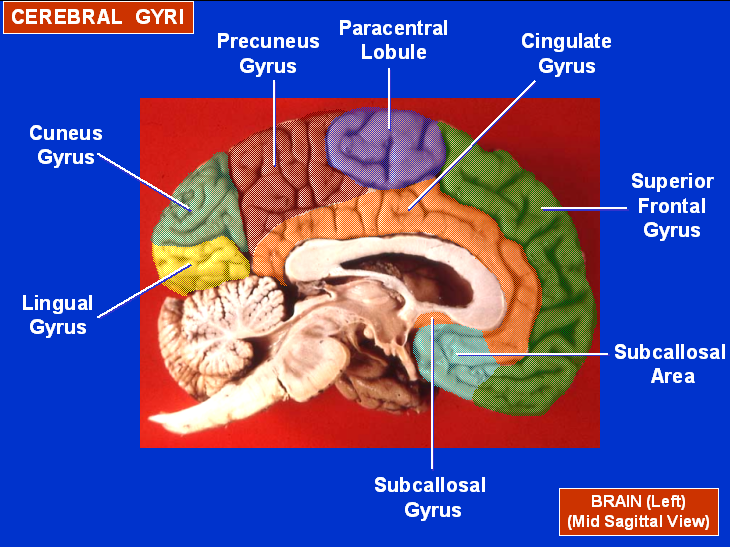
Medial surface of left cerebral hemisphere. (Precuneus visible at top left.)

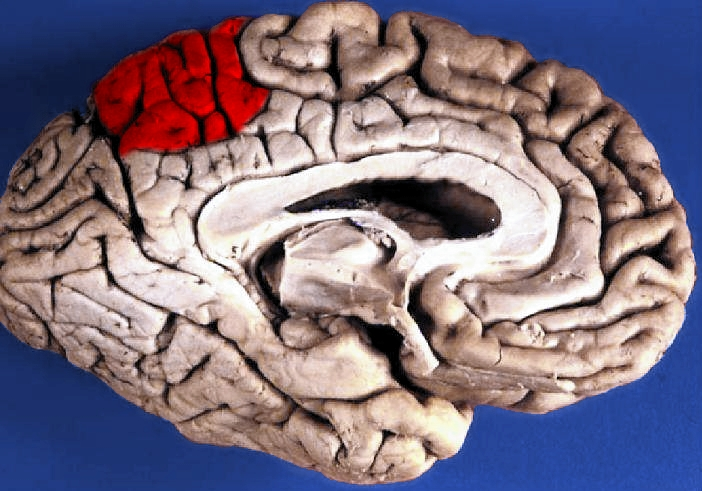
Medial surface of left cerebral hemisphere. (Precuneus colored in red.)

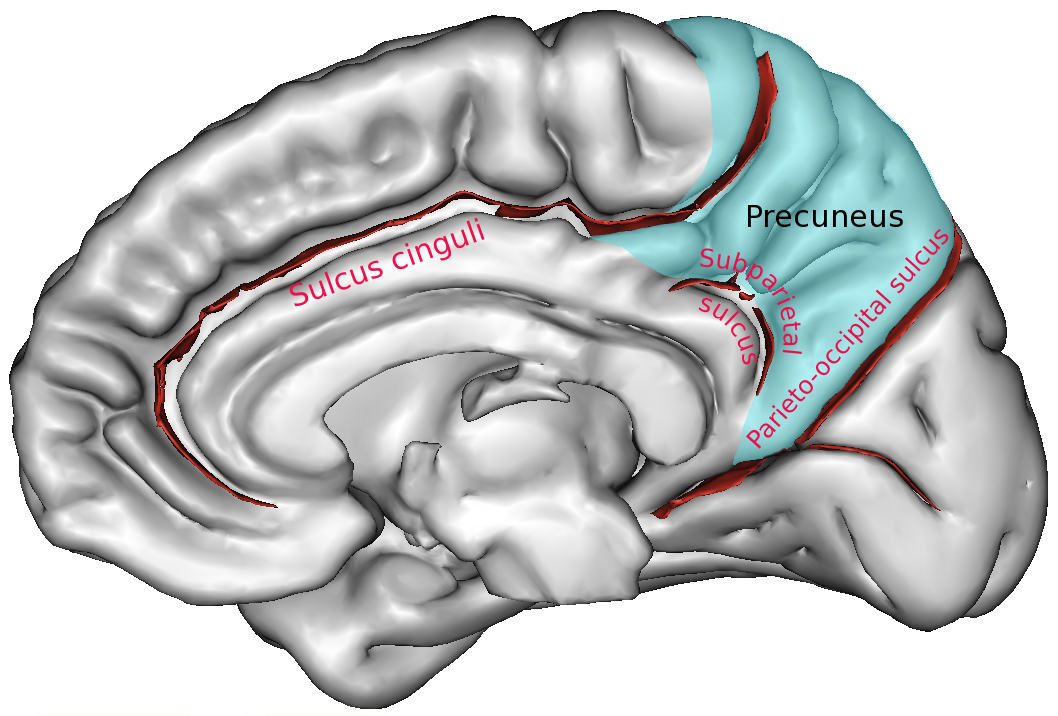
Boundaries of precuneus are defined by the three sulci. (shown in red)
1. marginal branch of the cingulate sulcus
2. parieto-occipital sulcus
3. subparietal sulcus
The area colored blue represents parietal lobe.

Human brain dissection video (1 min). Demonstrating the location of precuneus. ("SPL" in the video, means Superior parietal lobule)

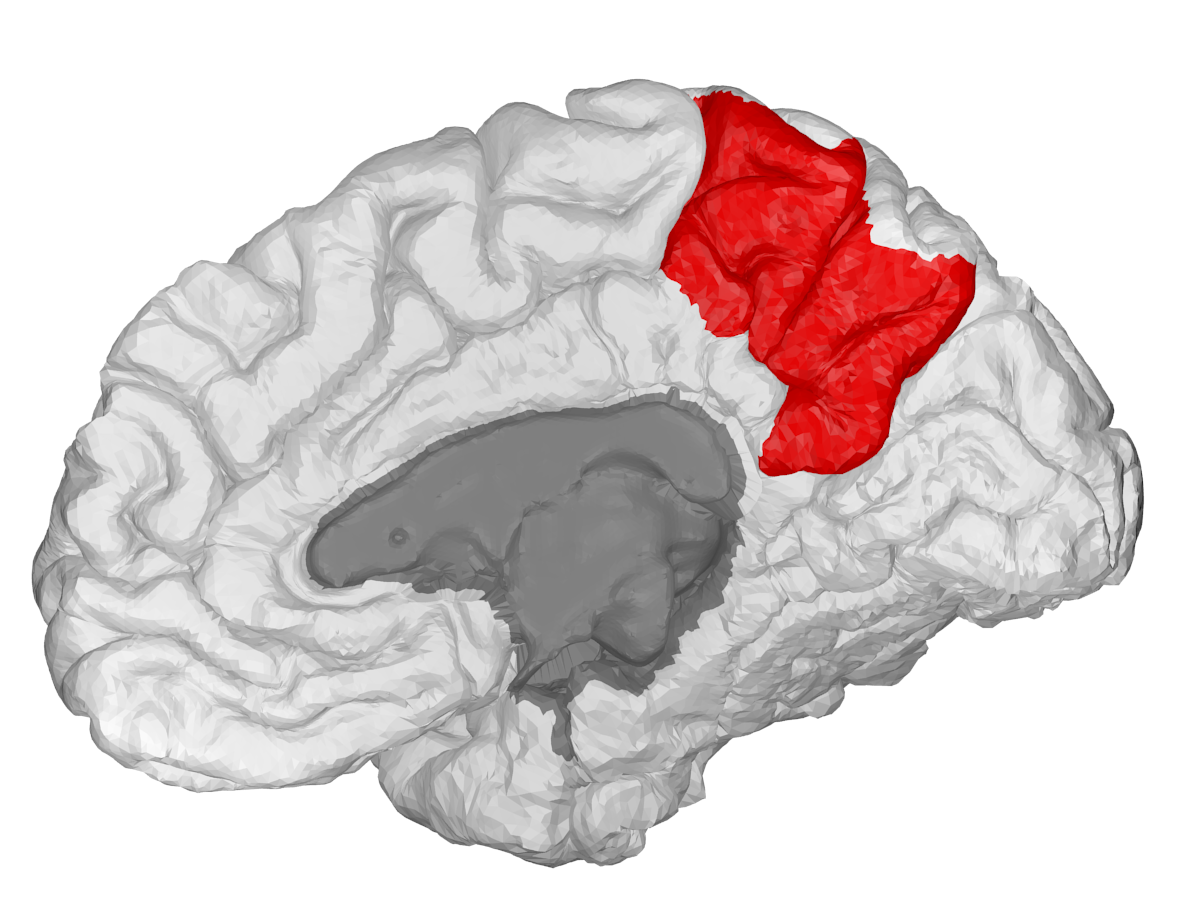
Precuneus of right cerebral hemisphere.

Precuneus highlighted in green on coronal T1 MRI images

Precuneus highlighted in green on sagittal T1 MRI images

Precuneus highlighted in green on transversal T1 MRI images
