= Paracentral sulcus =

Groove in the surface of the brain

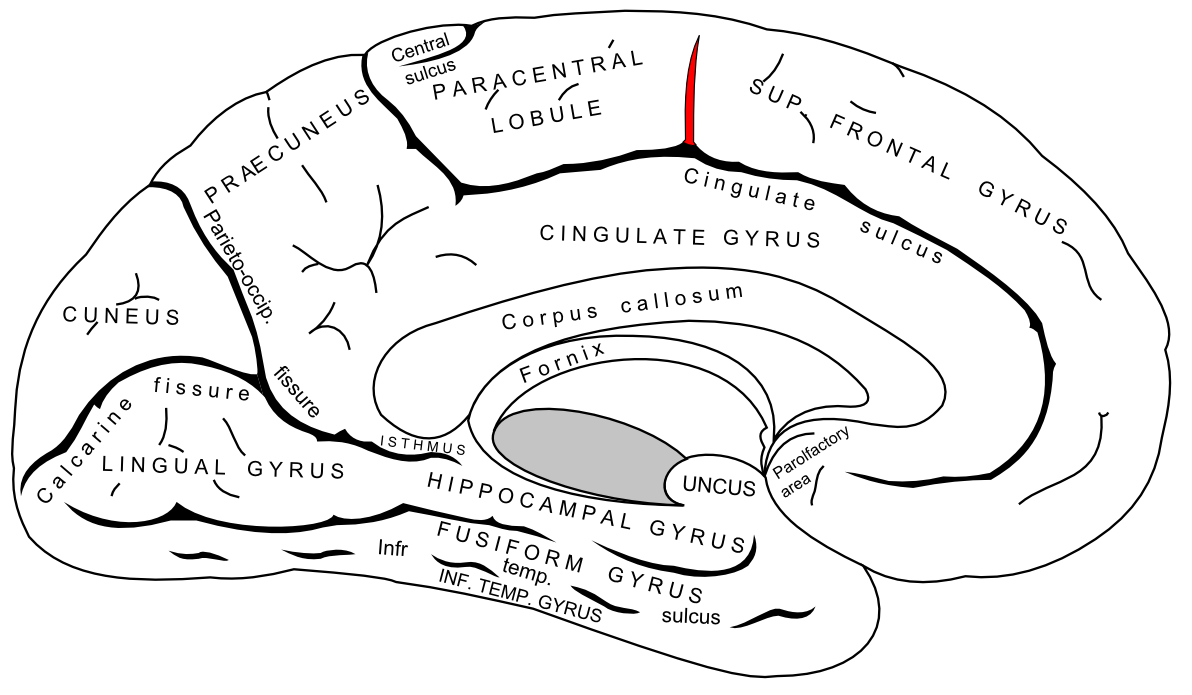
- Medial surface of left cerebral hemisphere. (paracentral sulcus shaded in red.)

Details

Identifiers
- Latin: sulcus paracentralis
- NeuroNames: 128
- TA98: A14.1.09.208
- TA2: 5460
- FMA: 83762

The paracentral sulcus is a sulcus of the brain. It forms the paracentral lobule's anterior border. It is part of the cingulate sulcus.

== Gallery ==
Medial surface of left cerebral hemisphere. (Cingulate sulcus shaded in red.)
