= Marginal sulcus =

Crevice in the brain separating the paracentral lobule and precuneus

- Medial surface of left cerebral hemisphere. (Marginal sulcus shown in red.)

Details

Identifiers
- Latin: ramus marginalis, sulcus marginalis
- NeuroNames: 98
- NeuroLex ID: birnlex_4030
- TA98: A14.1.09.204
- TA2: 5478
- FMA: 83773

In neuroanatomy, the marginal sulcus (margin of the cingulate sulcus) is a sulcus (crevice) that may be considered the termination of the cingulate sulcus. It separates the paracentral lobule anteriorly and the precuneus posteriorly.

== Additional images ==
Position of marginal sulcus (shown in red).

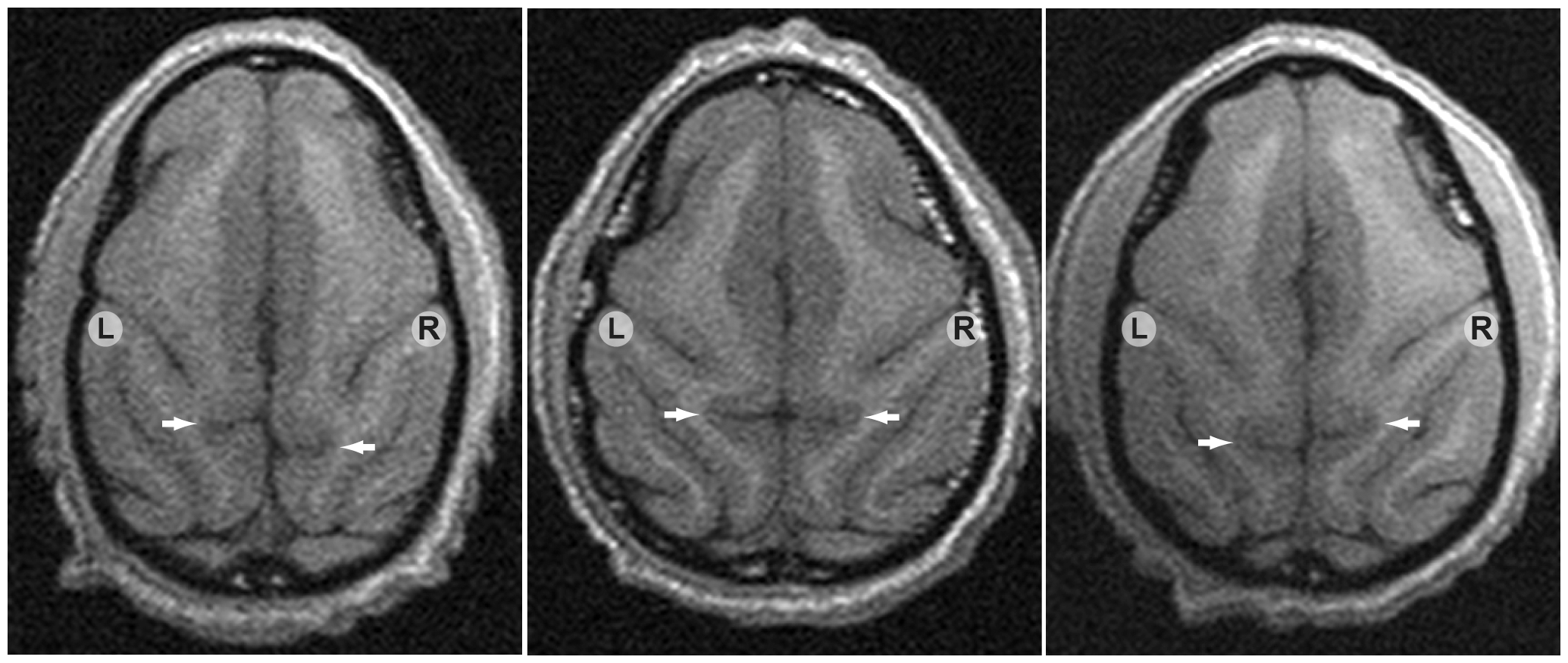
Transverse sections of brains of vervet monkey. It showing difference of the relative position of the left and right ascending ramus of the cingulate sulcus.
