= Parieto-occipital sulcus =

Fold which separates the parietal and occipital lobes of the brain

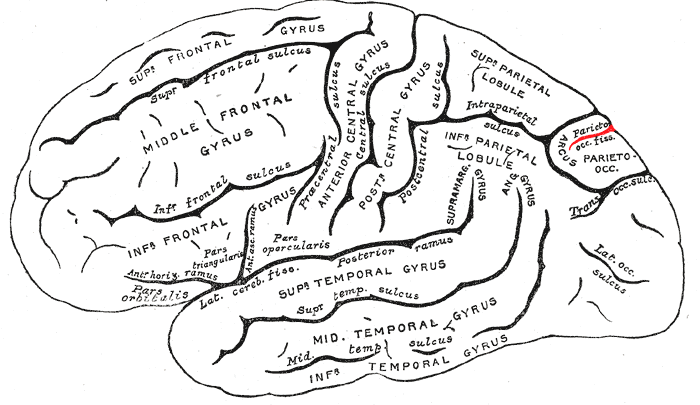
- Fig. 726: Lateral surface of left cerebral hemisphere, viewed from the side.

- Fig. 727: Medial surface of left cerebral hemisphere.

Details

Identifiers
- Latin: sulcus parietooccipitalis, fissura parietooccipitalis
- NeuroNames: 52
- NeuroLex ID: birnlex_1428
- TA98: A14.1.09.108
- TA2: 5437
- FMA: 83754

In neuroanatomy, the parieto-occipital sulcus (also called the parieto-occipital fissure) is a deep sulcus in the cerebral cortex that marks the boundary between the cuneus and precuneus, and also between the parietal and occipital lobes. Only a small part can be seen on the lateral surface of the hemisphere, its chief part being on the medial surface.

The lateral part of the parieto-occipital sulcus (Fig. 726) is situated about 5 cm in front of the occipital pole of the hemisphere, and measures about 1.25 cm. in length.

The medial part of the parieto-occipital sulcus (Fig. 727) runs downward and forward as a deep cleft on the medial surface of the hemisphere, and joins the calcarine fissure below and behind the posterior end of the corpus callosum. In most cases, it contains a submerged gyrus.

== Function ==
The parieto-occipital lobe has been found in various neuroimaging studies, including PET (positron-emission-tomography) studies, and SPECT (single-photon emission computed tomography) studies, to be involved along with the dorsolateral prefrontal cortex during planning.

== Gallery ==
Animation of left cerebral hemisphere. Parieto-occipital sulcus shown in red.

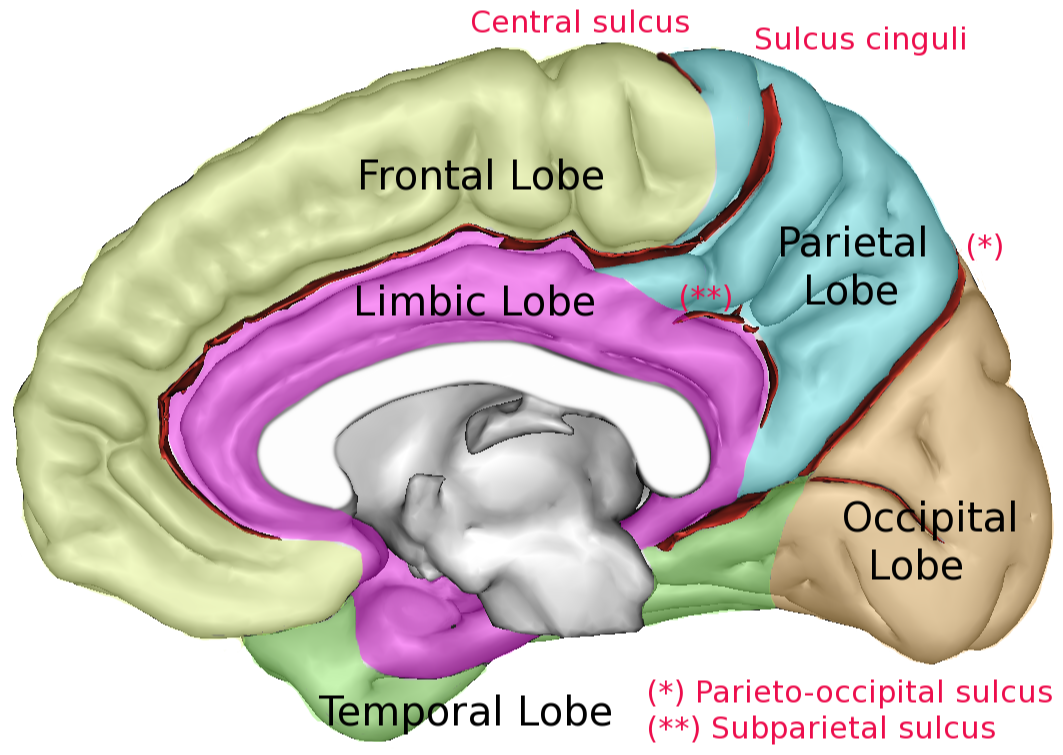
Medial surface of right hemisphere. Parieto-occipital sulcus labeled at top right as "*".

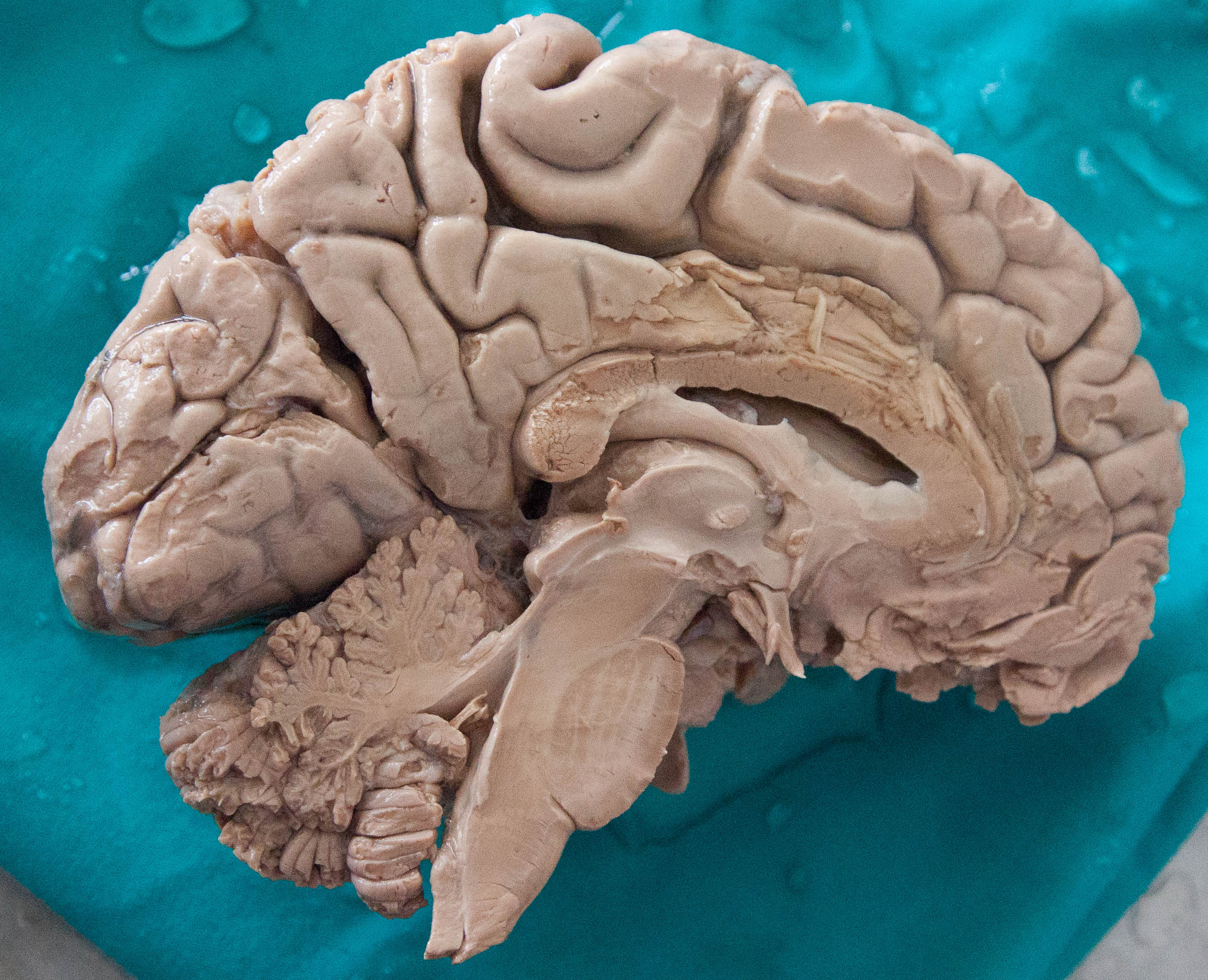
Medial surface of left hemisphere. Parieto-occipital sulcus visible at top left.

Human brain dissection video (1 min 52 sec). Demonstrating location of parieto-occipital sulcus of left cerebral hemisphere.
