= Calcarine sulcus =

Anatomical landmark in the brain of humans and other primates

- Medial surface of left cerebral hemisphere. ("Calcarine fissure" visible at left.)

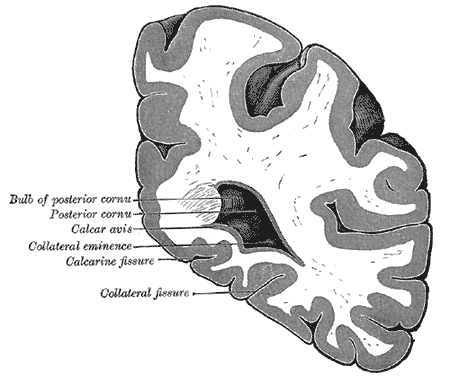
- Coronal section through posterior cornua of lateral ventricle. (Label for "Calcarine fissure" visible at bottom.)

Details
- Part of: Occipital lobe
- Artery: Calcarine branch of medial occipital artery

Identifiers
- Latin: sulcus calcarinus, fissura calcarina
- NeuroNames: 44
- NeuroLex ID: birnlex_1086
- TA98: A14.1.09.225
- TA2: 5486
- FMA: 83749

The calcarine sulcus (or calcarine fissure) is an anatomical landmark located at the caudal end of the medial surface of the brain of humans and other primates. Its name comes from the Latin "calcar" meaning "spur". It is very deep, and known as a complete sulcus.

== Structure ==
The calcarine sulcus begins near the occipital pole in two converging rami. It runs forward to a point a little below the splenium of the corpus callosum. Here, it is joined at an acute angle by the medial part of the parieto-occipital sulcus. The anterior part of this sulcus gives rise to the prominence of the calcar avis in the posterior cornu of the lateral ventricle. The cuneus is above the calcarine sulcus, while the lingual gyrus is below it.

=== Development ===
In humans, the calcarine sulcus usually becomes visible between 20 weeks and 28 weeks of gestation.

== Function ==
The calcarine sulcus is associated with the visual cortex. It is where the primary visual cortex (V1) is concentrated. The central visual field is located in the posterior portion of the calcarine sulcus, and the peripheral visual field is located in the anterior portion.

== History ==
The name of the calcarine sulcus comes from the Latin "calcar" meaning "spur".

== Additional images ==
Position of the calcarine sulcus (shown in red).

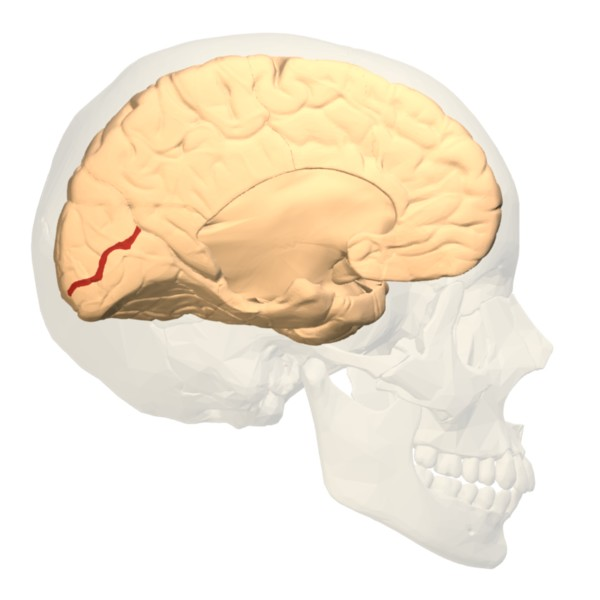
Calcarine fissure (shown in red).

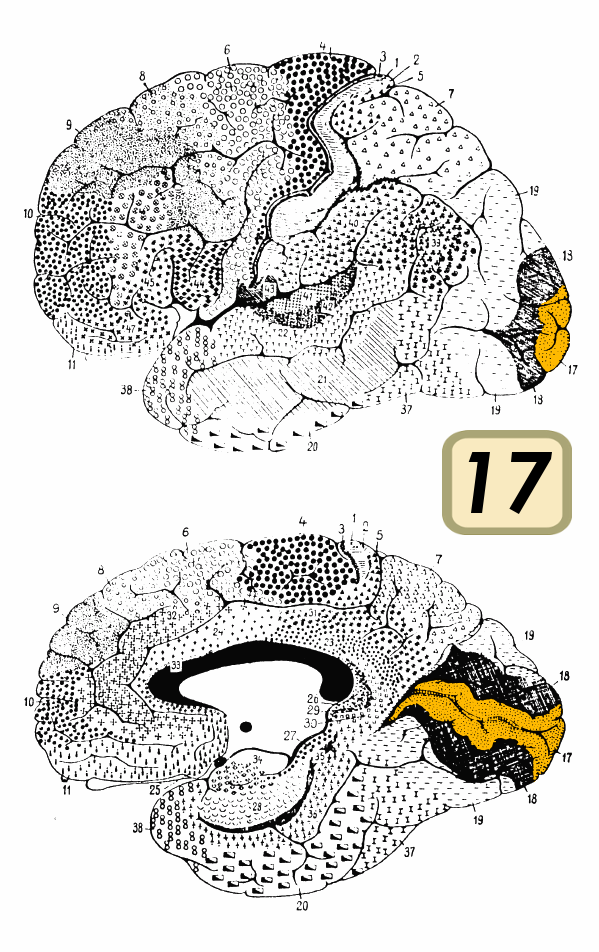
Calcarine sulcus highlighted in Brodmann Area 17, lateral and medial views.

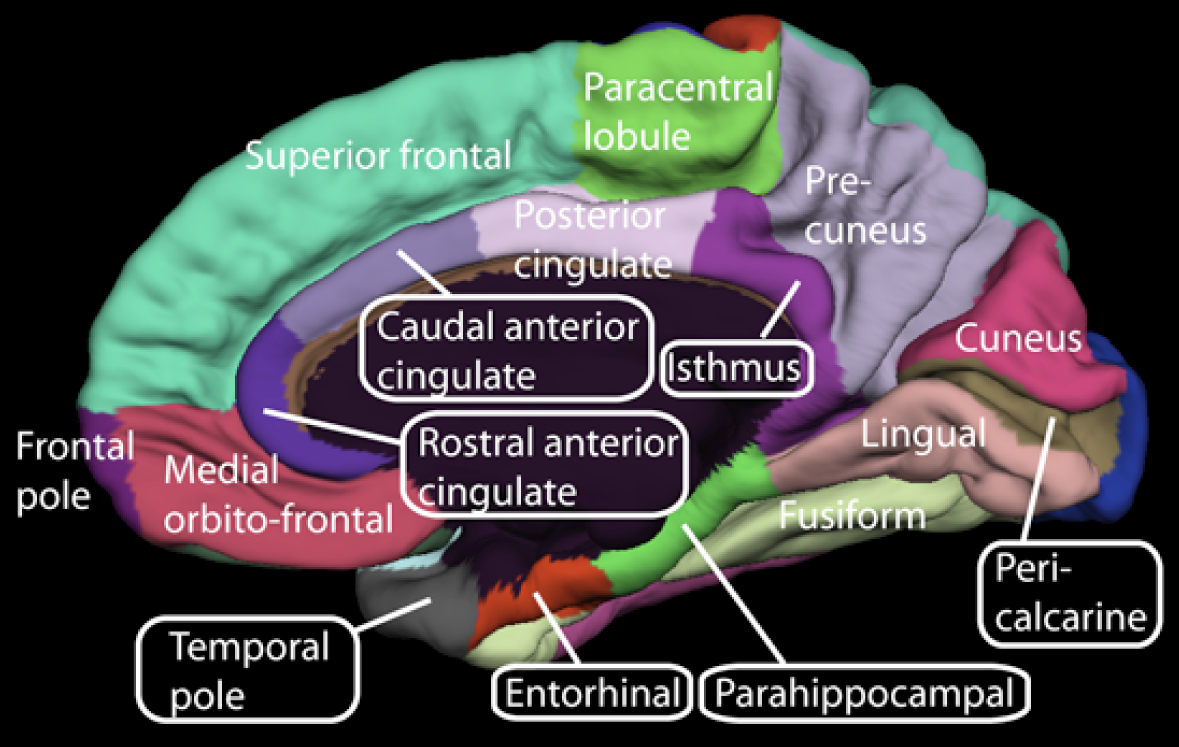
Medial surface of cerebral cortex - gyri
