= Paracentral lobule =

Region of the frontal and parietal lobes of the brain

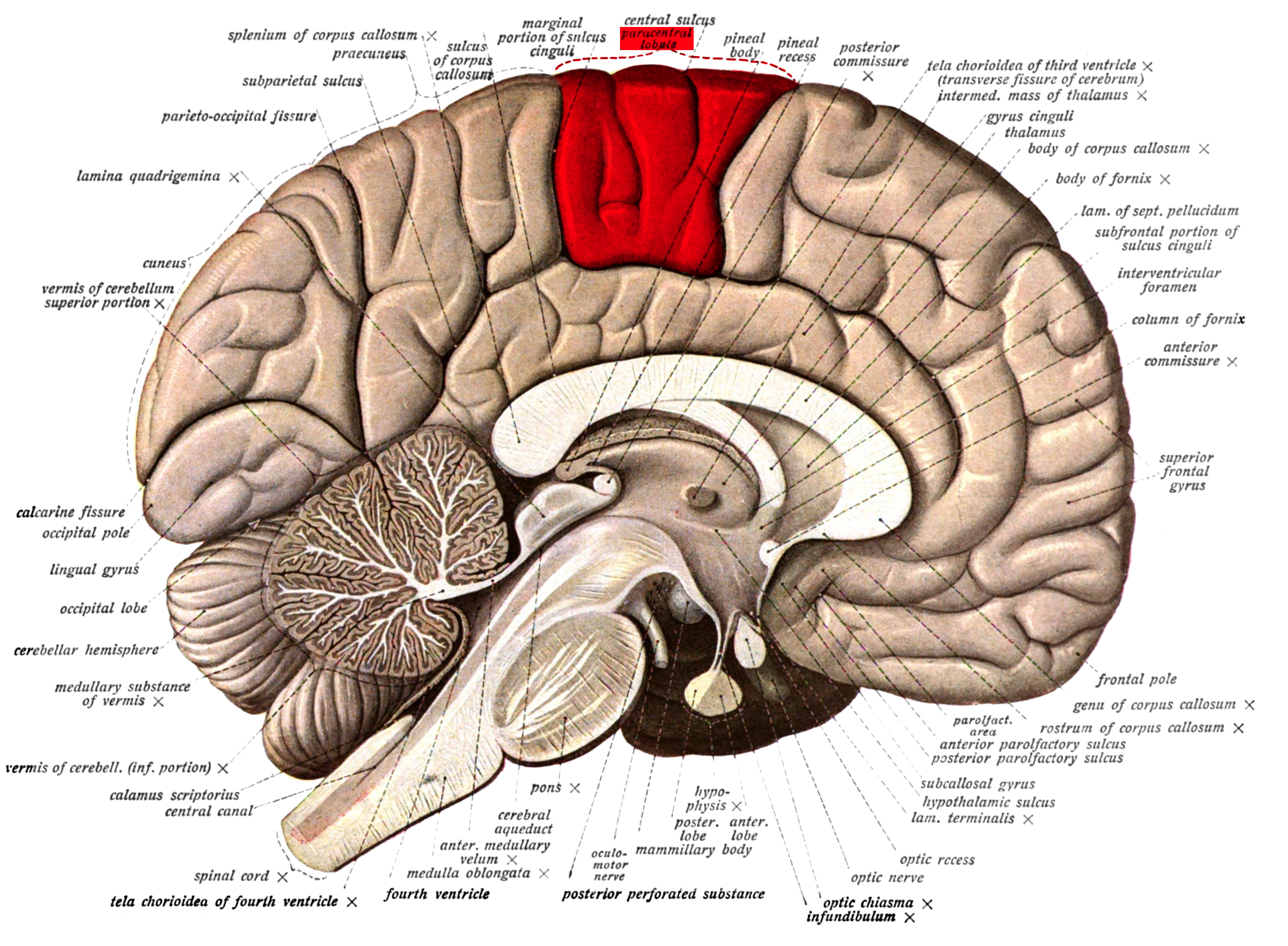
- Medial surface of left cerebral hemisphere. (Paracentral lobule is shown in red.)

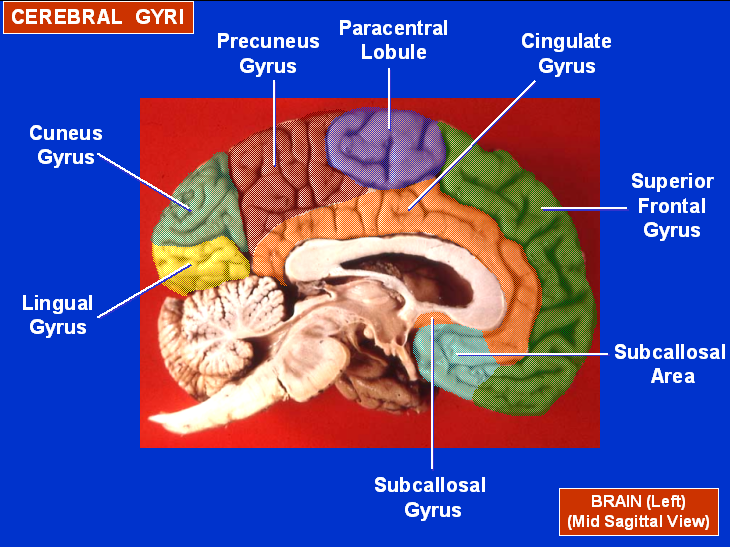
- Medial view of a halved human brain (Paracentral lobule labeled at top center, in blue.)

Details

Identifiers
- Latin: lobulus paracentralis
- NeuroNames: 1341
- TA98: A14.1.09.209
- TA2: 5466
- FMA: 77534

In neuroanatomy, the paracentral lobule is on the medial surface of the cerebral hemisphere and is the continuation of the precentral and postcentral gyri. The paracentral lobule controls motor and sensory innervations of the contralateral lower extremity. It is also responsible for control of blushing, defecation and urination.

It includes portions of the frontal and parietal lobes:

- The anterior portion of the paracentral lobule is part of the frontal lobe and contains a little portion of Brodmann's area 6 (SMA): this is because the paracentral sulcus (branch of the cingulate sulcus) does not correspond to the precentral sulcus on the medial plane.
- The posterior portion is considered part of the parietal lobe and deals with somatosensory of the distal limbs.

While the boundary between the lobes, the central sulcus, is easy to locate on the lateral surface of the cerebral hemispheres, this boundary is often discerned in a cytoarchetectonic manner in cases where the central sulcus is not visible on the medial surface.

== Function ==
Neurons in paracentral lobule are concerned with:

1. Motor and sensory innervations of the contralateral lower extremity
2. Regulation of physiological function such as blushing, defecation and micturition

== Blood supply ==
It is supplied by branches of the anterior cerebral artery.

== Applied anatomy ==
Damage of paracentral lobule occurs from occlusion of anterior cerebral artery. Characteristic manifestations include:

- Contralateral lower limb muscle weakness
- Urinary incontinence

== Gallery ==
Animation. Paracentral lobule is shown in red.

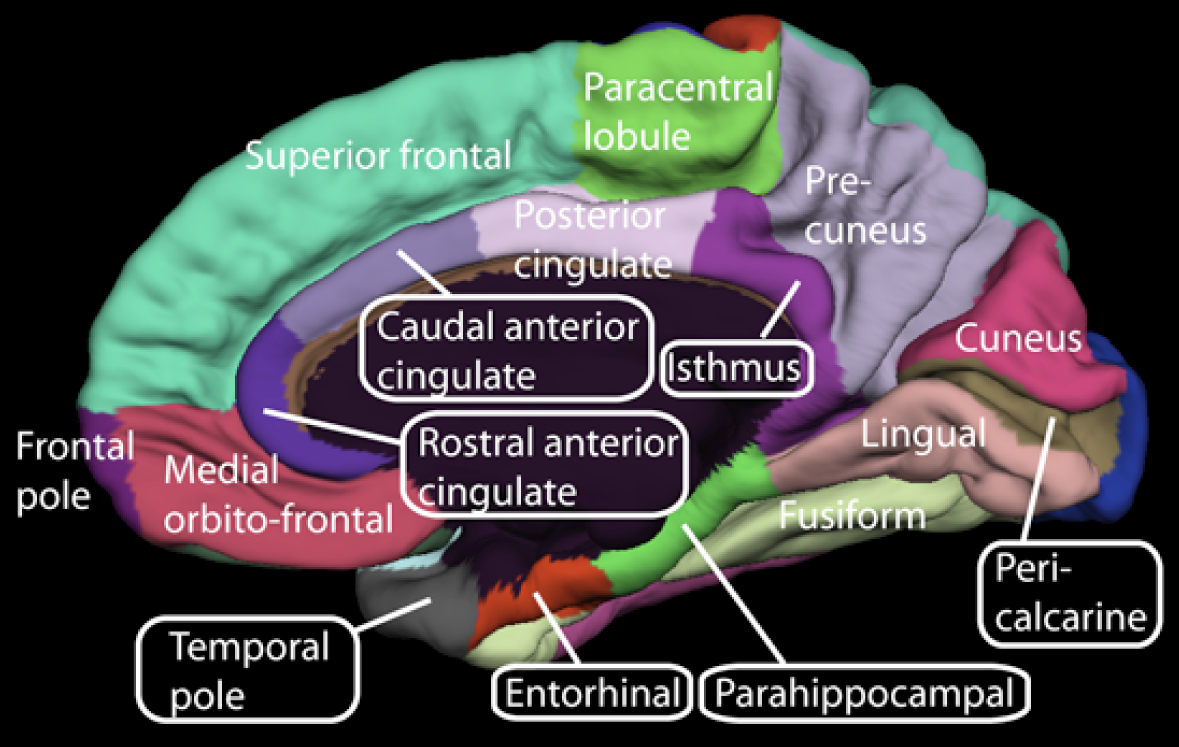
Medial view of a human right cerebral hemisphere. Paracentral lobule is labeled at top center, in green.

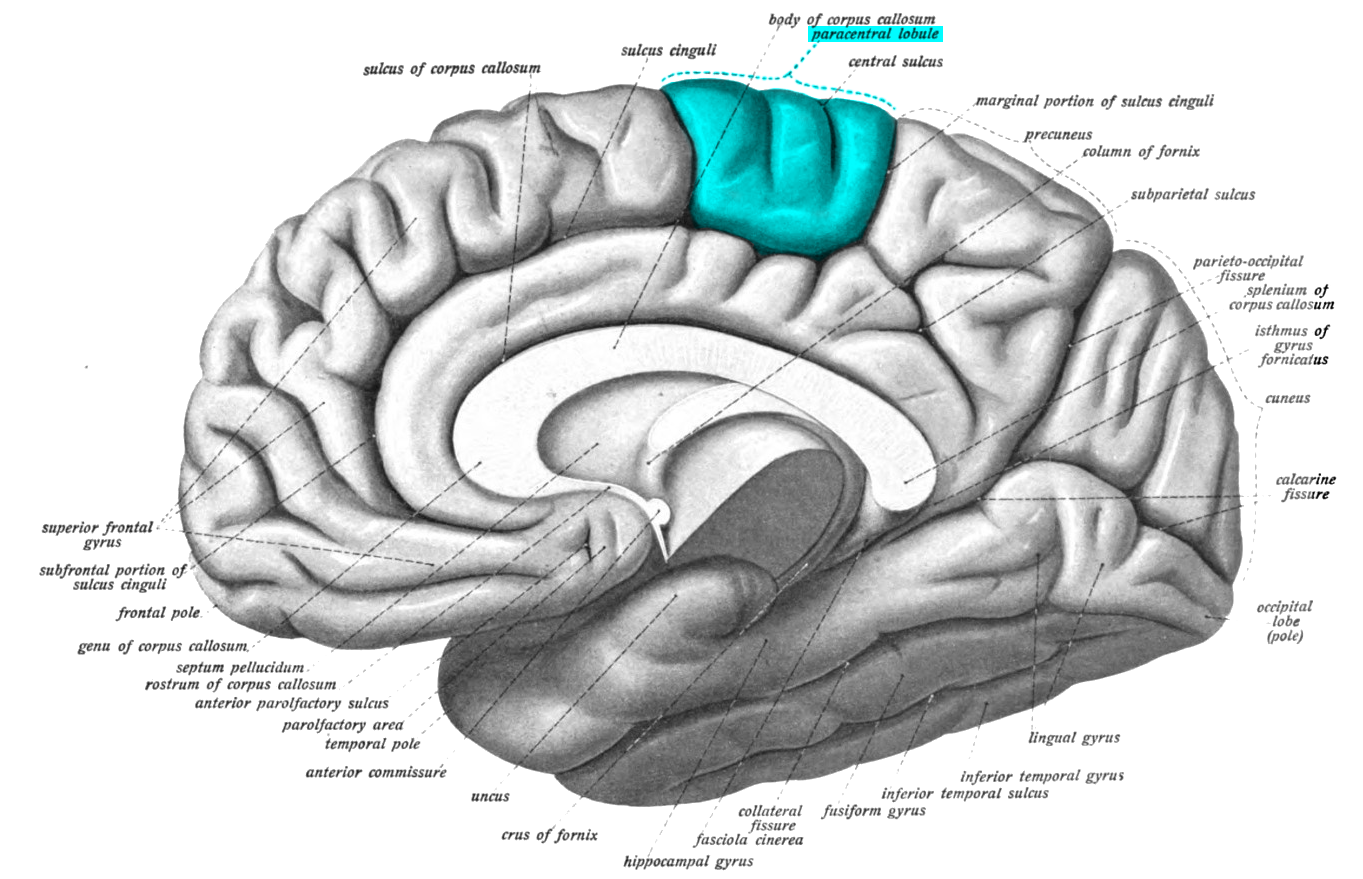
Medial view of a human right cerebral hemisphere. Paracentral lobule is labeled at top center, in blue.

Cingulate sulcus defines the boundaries of the paracentral lobule.

Marginal sulcus. It defines the posterior boundary of the paracentral lobule.

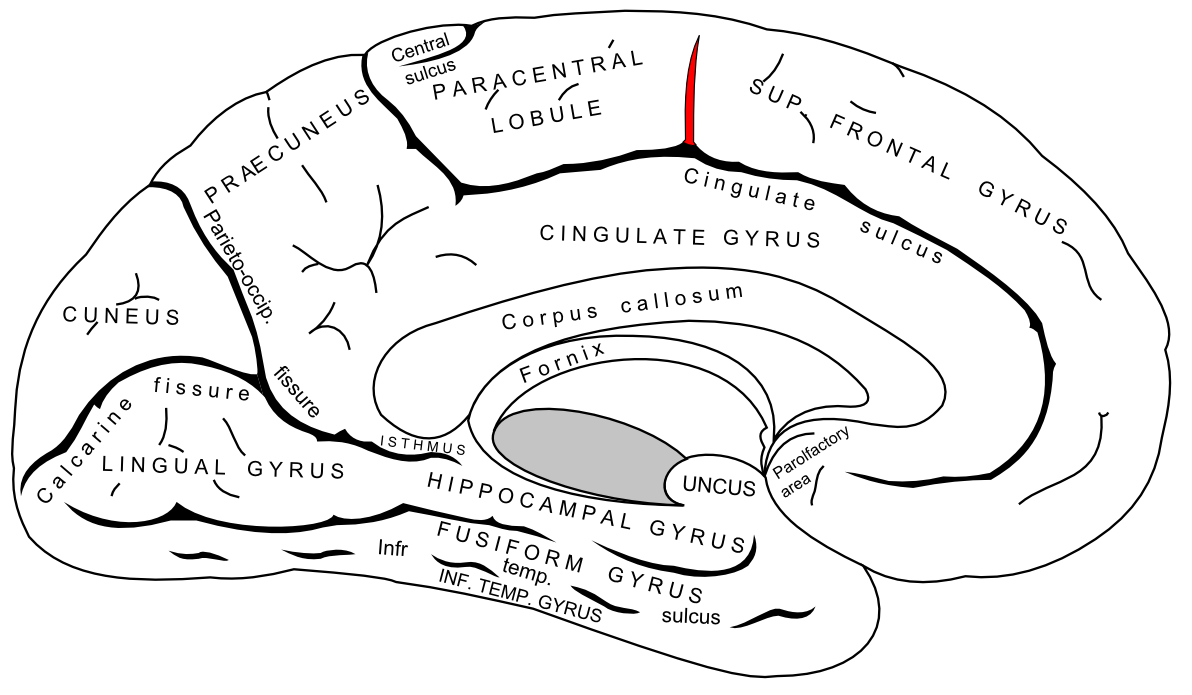
Paracentral sulcus. It defines the anterior boundary of the paracentral lobule.

Central sulcus on the medial surface. It divides the paracentral lobule into the anterior part and the posterior part.

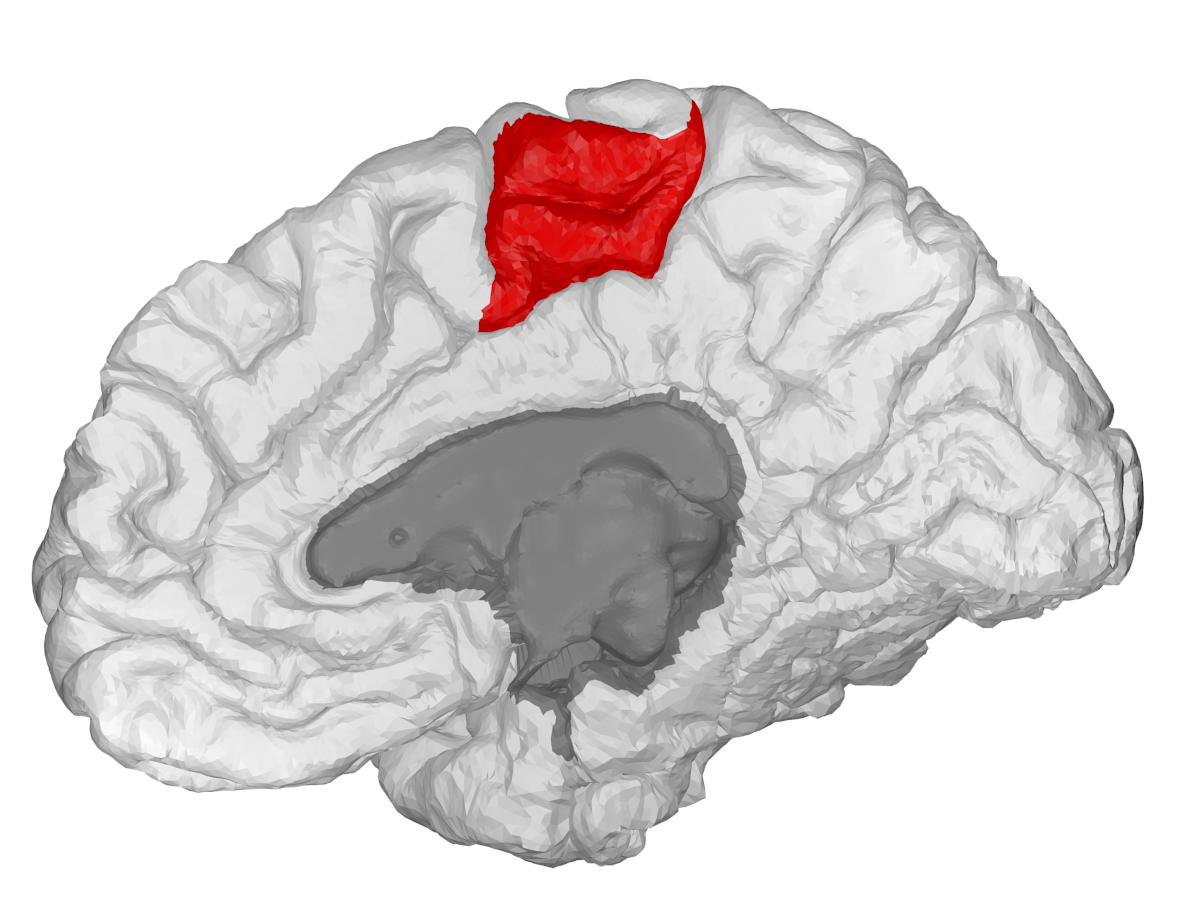
Paracentral lobule, shown in the right cerebral hemisphere.
